The Lepidoptera of Slovenia consist of both the butterflies and moths recorded from Slovenia.

Butterflies

Hesperiidae
Carcharodus alceae (Esper, 1780)
Carcharodus floccifera (Zeller, 1847)
Carcharodus lavatherae (Esper, 1783)
Carterocephalus palaemon (Pallas, 1771)
Erynnis tages (Linnaeus, 1758)
Hesperia comma (Linnaeus, 1758)
Heteropterus morpheus (Pallas, 1771)
Ochlodes sylvanus (Esper, 1777)
Pyrgus alveus (Hübner, 1803)
Pyrgus andromedae (Wallengren, 1853)
Pyrgus armoricanus (Oberthür, 1910)
Pyrgus cacaliae (Rambur, 1839)
Pyrgus carthami (Hübner, 1813)
Pyrgus cirsii (Rambur, 1839)
Pyrgus malvae (Linnaeus, 1758)
Pyrgus malvoides (Elwes & Edwards, 1897)
Pyrgus onopordi (Rambur, 1839)
Pyrgus serratulae (Rambur, 1839)
Pyrgus sidae (Esper, 1784)
Spialia sertorius (Hoffmannsegg, 1804)
Thymelicus acteon (Rottemburg, 1775)
Thymelicus lineola (Ochsenheimer, 1808)
Thymelicus sylvestris (Poda, 1761)

Lycaenidae
Agriades optilete (Knoch, 1781)
Agriades orbitulus (de Prunner, 1798)
Aricia agestis (Denis & Schiffermüller, 1775)
Aricia artaxerxes (Fabricius, 1793)
Callophrys rubi (Linnaeus, 1758)
Celastrina argiolus (Linnaeus, 1758)
Cupido minimus (Fuessly, 1775)
Cupido alcetas (Hoffmannsegg, 1804)
Cupido argiades (Pallas, 1771)
Cupido decolorata (Staudinger, 1886)
Cyaniris semiargus (Rottemburg, 1775)
Eumedonia eumedon (Esper, 1780)
Favonius quercus (Linnaeus, 1758)
Glaucopsyche alexis (Poda, 1761)
Lampides boeticus (Linnaeus, 1767)
Leptotes pirithous (Linnaeus, 1767)
Lycaena alciphron (Rottemburg, 1775)
Lycaena dispar (Haworth, 1802)
Lycaena hippothoe (Linnaeus, 1761)
Lycaena phlaeas (Linnaeus, 1761)
Lycaena tityrus (Poda, 1761)
Lycaena virgaureae (Linnaeus, 1758)
Lysandra bellargus (Rottemburg, 1775)
Lysandra coridon (Poda, 1761)
Phengaris alcon (Denis & Schiffermüller, 1775)
Phengaris arion (Linnaeus, 1758)
Phengaris nausithous (Bergstrasser, 1779)
Phengaris teleius (Bergstrasser, 1779)
Plebejus argus (Linnaeus, 1758)
Plebejus argyrognomon (Bergstrasser, 1779)
Plebejus idas (Linnaeus, 1761)
Polyommatus damon (Denis & Schiffermüller, 1775)
Polyommatus daphnis (Denis & Schiffermüller, 1775)
Polyommatus amandus (Schneider, 1792)
Polyommatus dorylas (Denis & Schiffermüller, 1775)
Polyommatus escheri (Hübner, 1823)
Polyommatus icarus (Rottemburg, 1775)
Polyommatus thersites (Cantener, 1835)
Pseudophilotes vicrama (Moore, 1865)
Satyrium acaciae (Fabricius, 1787)
Satyrium ilicis (Esper, 1779)
Satyrium pruni (Linnaeus, 1758)
Satyrium spini (Denis & Schiffermüller, 1775)
Satyrium w-album (Knoch, 1782)
Scolitantides orion (Pallas, 1771)
Thecla betulae (Linnaeus, 1758)

Nymphalidae
Aglais io (Linnaeus, 1758)
Aglais urticae (Linnaeus, 1758)
Apatura ilia (Denis & Schiffermüller, 1775)
Apatura iris (Linnaeus, 1758)
Aphantopus hyperantus (Linnaeus, 1758)
Araschnia levana (Linnaeus, 1758)
Arethusana arethusa (Denis & Schiffermüller, 1775)
Argynnis paphia (Linnaeus, 1758)
Argynnis pandora (Denis & Schiffermüller, 1775)
Boloria pales (Denis & Schiffermüller, 1775)
Boloria dia (Linnaeus, 1767)
Boloria euphrosyne (Linnaeus, 1758)
Boloria selene (Denis & Schiffermüller, 1775)
Boloria titania (Esper, 1793)
Brenthis daphne (Bergstrasser, 1780)
Brenthis hecate (Denis & Schiffermüller, 1775)
Brenthis ino (Rottemburg, 1775)
Brintesia circe (Fabricius, 1775)
Chazara briseis (Linnaeus, 1764)
Coenonympha arcania (Linnaeus, 1761)
Coenonympha gardetta (de Prunner, 1798)
Coenonympha glycerion (Borkhausen, 1788)
Coenonympha oedippus (Fabricius, 1787)
Coenonympha pamphilus (Linnaeus, 1758)
Coenonympha tullia (Muller, 1764)
Erebia aethiops (Esper, 1777)
Erebia calcaria Lorkovic, 1953
Erebia epiphron (Knoch, 1783)
Erebia euryale (Esper, 1805)
Erebia gorge (Hübner, 1804)
Erebia ligea (Linnaeus, 1758)
Erebia manto (Denis & Schiffermüller, 1775)
Erebia medusa (Denis & Schiffermüller, 1775)
Erebia melas (Herbst, 1796)
Erebia oeme (Hübner, 1804)
Erebia pandrose (Borkhausen, 1788)
Erebia pharte (Hübner, 1804)
Erebia pluto (de Prunner, 1798)
Erebia pronoe (Esper, 1780)
Erebia stirius (Godart, 1824)
Erebia styx (Freyer, 1834)
Euphydryas aurinia (Rottemburg, 1775)
Euphydryas intermedia (Menetries, 1859)
Euphydryas maturna (Linnaeus, 1758)
Fabriciana adippe (Denis & Schiffermüller, 1775)
Fabriciana niobe (Linnaeus, 1758)
Hipparchia fagi (Scopoli, 1763)
Hipparchia statilinus (Hufnagel, 1766)
Hipparchia semele (Linnaeus, 1758)
Hyponephele lycaon (Rottemburg, 1775)
Issoria lathonia (Linnaeus, 1758)
Lasiommata maera (Linnaeus, 1758)
Lasiommata megera (Linnaeus, 1767)
Lasiommata petropolitana (Fabricius, 1787)
Libythea celtis (Laicharting, 1782)
Limenitis camilla (Linnaeus, 1764)
Limenitis populi (Linnaeus, 1758)
Limenitis reducta Staudinger, 1901
Lopinga achine (Scopoli, 1763)
Maniola jurtina (Linnaeus, 1758)
Melanargia galathea (Linnaeus, 1758)
Melitaea athalia (Rottemburg, 1775)
Melitaea aurelia Nickerl, 1850
Melitaea britomartis Assmann, 1847
Melitaea cinxia (Linnaeus, 1758)
Melitaea diamina (Lang, 1789)
Melitaea didyma (Esper, 1778)
Melitaea phoebe (Denis & Schiffermüller, 1775)
Minois dryas (Scopoli, 1763)
Neptis rivularis (Scopoli, 1763)
Neptis sappho (Pallas, 1771)
Nymphalis antiopa (Linnaeus, 1758)
Nymphalis polychloros (Linnaeus, 1758)
Nymphalis vaualbum (Denis & Schiffermüller, 1775)
Nymphalis xanthomelas (Esper, 1781)
Pararge aegeria (Linnaeus, 1758)
Polygonia c-album (Linnaeus, 1758)
Polygonia egea (Cramer, 1775)
Pyronia cecilia (Vallantin, 1894)
Pyronia tithonus (Linnaeus, 1767)
Satyrus ferula (Fabricius, 1793)
Speyeria aglaja (Linnaeus, 1758)
Vanessa atalanta (Linnaeus, 1758)
Vanessa cardui (Linnaeus, 1758)

Papilionidae
Iphiclides podalirius (Linnaeus, 1758)
Papilio machaon Linnaeus, 1758
Parnassius apollo (Linnaeus, 1758)
Parnassius mnemosyne (Linnaeus, 1758)
Zerynthia polyxena (Denis & Schiffermüller, 1775)

Pieridae
Anthocharis cardamines (Linnaeus, 1758)
Aporia crataegi (Linnaeus, 1758)
Colias alfacariensis Ribbe, 1905
Colias croceus (Fourcroy, 1785)
Colias hyale (Linnaeus, 1758)
Colias myrmidone (Esper, 1781)
Gonepteryx rhamni (Linnaeus, 1758)
Leptidea morsei (Fenton, 1882)
Leptidea sinapis (Linnaeus, 1758)
Pieris brassicae (Linnaeus, 1758)
Pieris bryoniae (Hübner, 1806)
Pieris ergane (Geyer, 1828)
Pieris mannii (Mayer, 1851)
Pieris napi (Linnaeus, 1758)
Pieris rapae (Linnaeus, 1758)
Pontia callidice (Hübner, 1800)
Pontia edusa (Fabricius, 1777)

Riodinidae
Hamearis lucina (Linnaeus, 1758)

Moths

Adelidae
Adela croesella (Scopoli, 1763)
Cauchas leucocerella (Scopoli, 1763)
Cauchas rufimitrella (Scopoli, 1763)
Nemophora metallica (Poda, 1761)

Alucitidae
Alucita cymatodactyla Zeller, 1852
Pterotopteryx dodecadactyla Hübner, 1813

Autostichidae
Symmoca albicanella Zeller, 1868
Symmoca signella (Hübner, 1796)

Blastobasidae
Blastobasis phycidella (Zeller, 1839)

Brachodidae
Brachodes appendiculata (Esper, 1783)
Brachodes pumila (Ochsenheimer, 1808)

Brahmaeidae
Lemonia dumi (Linnaeus, 1761)
Lemonia taraxaci (Denis & Schiffermüller, 1775)

Chimabachidae
Diurnea fagella (Denis & Schiffermüller, 1775)

Cimeliidae
Axia margarita (Hübner, 1813)

Coleophoridae
Coleophora adelogrammella Zeller, 1849
Coleophora albella (Thunberg, 1788)
Coleophora albicostella (Duponchel, 1842)
Coleophora albidella (Denis & Schiffermüller, 1775)
Coleophora alcyonipennella (Kollar, 1832)
Coleophora alnifoliae Barasch, 1934
Coleophora alticolella Zeller, 1849
Coleophora betulella Heinemann, 1877
Coleophora bilineatella Zeller, 1849
Coleophora binderella (Kollar, 1832)
Coleophora cecidophorella Oudejans, 1972
Coleophora chamaedriella Bruand, 1852
Coleophora conspicuella Zeller, 1849
Coleophora currucipennella Zeller, 1839
Coleophora cythisanthi Baldizzone, 1978
Coleophora derasofasciella Klimesch, 1952
Coleophora discordella Zeller, 1849
Coleophora glaucicolella Wood, 1892
Coleophora glitzella Hofmann, 1869
Coleophora graminicolella Heinemann, 1876
Coleophora gryphipennella (Hübner, 1796)
Coleophora hartigi Toll, 1944
Coleophora hemerobiella (Scopoli, 1763)
Coleophora ibipennella Zeller, 1849
Coleophora kuehnella (Goeze, 1783)
Coleophora laricella (Hübner, 1817)
Coleophora lineolea (Haworth, 1828)
Coleophora lithargyrinella Zeller, 1849
Coleophora lutipennella (Zeller, 1838)
Coleophora mayrella (Hübner, 1813)
Coleophora medelichensis Krone, 1908
Coleophora milvipennis Zeller, 1839
Coleophora niveicostella Zeller, 1839
Coleophora niveistrigella Wocke, 1877
Coleophora nubivagella Zeller, 1849
Coleophora nutantella Muhlig & Frey, 1857
Coleophora obscenella Herrich-Schäffer, 1855
Coleophora obviella Rebel, 1914
Coleophora oriolella Zeller, 1849
Coleophora ornatipennella (Hübner, 1796)
Coleophora paramayrella Nel, 1993
Coleophora preisseckeri Toll, 1942
Coleophora pseudolinosyris Kasy, 1979
Coleophora pyrrhulipennella Zeller, 1839
Coleophora ramosella Zeller, 1849
Coleophora riffelensis Rebel, 1913
Coleophora salicorniae Heinemann & Wocke, 1877
Coleophora saturatella Stainton, 1850
Coleophora saxicolella (Duponchel, 1843)
Coleophora serpylletorum Hering, 1889
Coleophora serratella (Linnaeus, 1761)
Coleophora serratulella Herrich-Schäffer, 1855
Coleophora silenella Herrich-Schäffer, 1855
Coleophora squalorella Zeller, 1849
Coleophora squamella Constant, 1885
Coleophora sternipennella (Zetterstedt, 1839)
Coleophora striatipennella Nylander in Tengstrom, 1848
Coleophora sylvaticella Wood, 1892
Coleophora therinella Tengstrom, 1848
Coleophora trientella Christoph, 1872
Coleophora trifolii (Curtis, 1832)
Coleophora trochilella (Duponchel, 1843)
Coleophora versurella Zeller, 1849
Coleophora vicinella Zeller, 1849
Coleophora violacea (Strom, 1783)
Coleophora virgatella Zeller, 1849
Coleophora virgaureae Stainton, 1857
Coleophora vulnerariae Zeller, 1839
Coleophora wockeella Zeller, 1849

Cosmopterigidae
Eteobalea albiapicella (Duponchel, 1843)
Eteobalea anonymella (Riedl, 1965)
Eteobalea intermediella (Riedl, 1966)
Eteobalea serratella (Treitschke, 1833)
Pancalia leuwenhoekella (Linnaeus, 1761)
Pancalia nodosella (Bruand, 1851)
Pyroderces argyrogrammos (Zeller, 1847)
Vulcaniella pomposella (Zeller, 1839)

Cossidae
Acossus terebra (Denis & Schiffermüller, 1775)
Cossus cossus (Linnaeus, 1758)
Dyspessa ulula (Borkhausen, 1790)
Parahypopta caestrum (Hübner, 1808)
Phragmataecia castaneae (Hübner, 1790)
Zeuzera pyrina (Linnaeus, 1761)

Crambidae
Agriphila inquinatella (Denis & Schiffermüller, 1775)
Agriphila straminella (Denis & Schiffermüller, 1775)
Agriphila tristella (Denis & Schiffermüller, 1775)
Agrotera nemoralis (Scopoli, 1763)
Anania coronata (Hufnagel, 1767)
Anania crocealis (Hübner, 1796)
Anania funebris (Strom, 1768)
Anania fuscalis (Denis & Schiffermüller, 1775)
Anania terrealis (Treitschke, 1829)
Catoptria combinella (Denis & Schiffermüller, 1775)
Catoptria conchella (Denis & Schiffermüller, 1775)
Catoptria falsella (Denis & Schiffermüller, 1775)
Catoptria luctiferella (Hübner, 1813)
Catoptria margaritella (Denis & Schiffermüller, 1775)
Catoptria myella (Hübner, 1796)
Catoptria mytilella (Hübner, 1805)
Catoptria petrificella (Hübner, 1796)
Catoptria pinella (Linnaeus, 1758)
Catoptria pyramidellus (Treitschke, 1832)
Catoptria verellus (Zincken, 1817)
Cholius luteolaris (Scopoli, 1772)
Chrysocrambus craterella (Scopoli, 1763)
Chrysoteuchia culmella (Linnaeus, 1758)
Crambus lathoniellus (Zincken, 1817)
Crambus pascuella (Linnaeus, 1758)
Crambus perlella (Scopoli, 1763)
Crambus pratella (Linnaeus, 1758)
Crambus silvella (Hübner, 1813)
Cynaeda dentalis (Denis & Schiffermüller, 1775)
Diasemia reticularis (Linnaeus, 1761)
Eudonia lacustrata (Panzer, 1804)
Eudonia laetella (Zeller, 1846)
Eudonia murana (Curtis, 1827)
Eudonia sudetica (Zeller, 1839)
Eurrhypis pollinalis (Denis & Schiffermüller, 1775)
Evergestis extimalis (Scopoli, 1763)
Evergestis forficalis (Linnaeus, 1758)
Evergestis sophialis (Fabricius, 1787)
Heliothela wulfeniana (Scopoli, 1763)
Metaxmeste phrygialis (Hübner, 1796)
Metaxmeste schrankiana (Hochenwarth, 1785)
Nomophila noctuella (Denis & Schiffermüller, 1775)
Orenaia alpestralis (Fabricius, 1787)
Orenaia helveticalis (Herrich-Schäffer, 1851)
Orenaia lugubralis (Lederer, 1857)
Ostrinia nubilalis (Hübner, 1796)
Paratalanta hyalinalis (Hübner, 1796)
Paratalanta pandalis (Hübner, 1825)
Platytes cerussella (Denis & Schiffermüller, 1775)
Pleuroptya ruralis (Scopoli, 1763)
Pyrausta aerealis (Hübner, 1793)
Pyrausta aurata (Scopoli, 1763)
Pyrausta cingulata (Linnaeus, 1758)
Pyrausta coracinalis Leraut, 1982
Pyrausta despicata (Scopoli, 1763)
Pyrausta falcatalis Guenee, 1854
Pyrausta nigrata (Scopoli, 1763)
Pyrausta obfuscata (Scopoli, 1763)
Pyrausta porphyralis (Denis & Schiffermüller, 1775)
Pyrausta purpuralis (Linnaeus, 1758)
Scirpophaga praelata (Scopoli, 1763)
Scoparia ambigualis (Treitschke, 1829)
Scoparia ingratella (Zeller, 1846)
Scoparia manifestella (Herrich-Schäffer, 1848)
Scoparia pyralella (Denis & Schiffermüller, 1775)
Scoparia subfusca Haworth, 1811
Sitochroa verticalis (Linnaeus, 1758)
Thisanotia chrysonuchella (Scopoli, 1763)
Udea alpinalis (Denis & Schiffermüller, 1775)
Udea carniolica Huemer & Tarmann, 1989
Udea decrepitalis (Herrich-Schäffer, 1848)
Udea ferrugalis (Hübner, 1796)
Udea lutealis (Hübner, 1809)
Udea nebulalis (Hübner, 1796)
Udea olivalis (Denis & Schiffermüller, 1775)
Udea prunalis (Denis & Schiffermüller, 1775)
Udea uliginosalis (Stephens, 1834)

Drepanidae
Achlya flavicornis (Linnaeus, 1758)
Asphalia ruficollis (Denis & Schiffermüller, 1775)
Cilix glaucata (Scopoli, 1763)
Cymatophorina diluta (Denis & Schiffermüller, 1775)
Drepana curvatula (Borkhausen, 1790)
Drepana falcataria (Linnaeus, 1758)
Falcaria lacertinaria (Linnaeus, 1758)
Habrosyne pyritoides (Hufnagel, 1766)
Ochropacha duplaris (Linnaeus, 1761)
Polyploca ridens (Fabricius, 1787)
Sabra harpagula (Esper, 1786)
Tethea ocularis (Linnaeus, 1767)
Tethea or (Denis & Schiffermüller, 1775)
Tetheella fluctuosa (Hübner, 1803)
Thyatira batis (Linnaeus, 1758)
Watsonalla binaria (Hufnagel, 1767)
Watsonalla cultraria (Fabricius, 1775)
Watsonalla uncinula (Borkhausen, 1790)

Elachistidae
Agonopterix alstromeriana (Clerck, 1759)
Agonopterix arenella (Denis & Schiffermüller, 1775)
Agonopterix purpurea (Haworth, 1811)
Agonopterix socerbi Šumpich, 2012
Anchinia daphnella (Denis & Schiffermüller, 1775)
Anchinia laureolella Herrich-Schäffer, 1854
Elachista metella Kaila, 2002
Ethmia bipunctella (Fabricius, 1775)
Ethmia dodecea (Haworth, 1828)
Ethmia flavianella (Treitschke, 1832)
Ethmia pusiella (Linnaeus, 1758)
Ethmia quadrillella (Goeze, 1783)
Ethmia terminella T. B. Fletcher, 1938
Hypercallia citrinalis (Scopoli, 1763)
Orophia denisella (Denis & Schiffermüller, 1775)
Orophia mendosella (Zeller, 1868)
Orophia sordidella (Hübner, 1796)
Spuleria flavicaput (Haworth, 1828)

Endromidae
Endromis versicolora (Linnaeus, 1758)

Epermeniidae
Epermenia chaerophyllella (Goeze, 1783)
Epermenia illigerella (Hübner, 1813)
Epermenia strictellus (Wocke, 1867)
Epermenia devotella (Heyden, 1863)
Epermenia pontificella (Hübner, 1796)
Epermenia scurella (Stainton, 1851)
Ochromolopis ictella (Hübner, 1813)
Phaulernis rebeliella Gaedike, 1966

Erebidae
Amata phegea (Linnaeus, 1758)
Apopestes spectrum (Esper, 1787)
Arctia caja (Linnaeus, 1758)
Arctia villica (Linnaeus, 1758)
Arctornis l-nigrum (Muller, 1764)
Atolmis rubricollis (Linnaeus, 1758)
Autophila dilucida (Hübner, 1808)
Autophila limbata (Staudinger, 1871)
Autophila anaphanes Boursin, 1940
Callimorpha dominula (Linnaeus, 1758)
Calliteara pudibunda (Linnaeus, 1758)
Calymma communimacula (Denis & Schiffermüller, 1775)
Calyptra thalictri (Borkhausen, 1790)
Catephia alchymista (Denis & Schiffermüller, 1775)
Catocala coniuncta (Esper, 1787)
Catocala conversa (Esper, 1783)
Catocala dilecta (Hübner, 1808)
Catocala disjuncta (Geyer, 1828)
Catocala diversa (Geyer, 1828)
Catocala electa (Vieweg, 1790)
Catocala elocata (Esper, 1787)
Catocala fraxini (Linnaeus, 1758)
Catocala fulminea (Scopoli, 1763)
Catocala hymenaea (Denis & Schiffermüller, 1775)
Catocala lupina Herrich-Schäffer, 1851
Catocala nupta (Linnaeus, 1767)
Catocala nymphaea (Esper, 1787)
Catocala nymphagoga (Esper, 1787)
Catocala promissa (Denis & Schiffermüller, 1775)
Catocala puerpera (Giorna, 1791)
Catocala sponsa (Linnaeus, 1767)
Clytie syriaca (Bugnion, 1837)
Colobochyla salicalis (Denis & Schiffermüller, 1775)
Coscinia striata (Linnaeus, 1758)
Cybosia mesomella (Linnaeus, 1758)
Cymbalophora pudica (Esper, 1785)
Diacrisia sannio (Linnaeus, 1758)
Diaphora mendica (Clerck, 1759)
Dicallomera fascelina (Linnaeus, 1758)
Drasteria cailino (Lefebvre, 1827)
Dysauxes ancilla (Linnaeus, 1767)
Dysauxes famula (Freyer, 1836)
Dysgonia algira (Linnaeus, 1767)
Dysgonia torrida (Guenee, 1852)
Eilema caniola (Hübner, 1808)
Eilema complana (Linnaeus, 1758)
Eilema depressa (Esper, 1787)
Eilema griseola (Hübner, 1803)
Eilema lurideola (Zincken, 1817)
Eilema lutarella (Linnaeus, 1758)
Eilema pseudocomplana (Daniel, 1939)
Eilema pygmaeola (Doubleday, 1847)
Eilema sororcula (Hufnagel, 1766)
Eublemma amoena (Hübner, 1803)
Eublemma candidana (Fabricius, 1794)
Eublemma himmighoffeni (Milliere, 1867)
Eublemma minutata (Fabricius, 1794)
Eublemma ostrina (Hübner, 1808)
Eublemma parva (Hübner, 1808)
Eublemma polygramma (Duponchel, 1842)
Eublemma purpurina (Denis & Schiffermüller, 1775)
Eublemma scitula Rambur, 1833
Eublemma viridula (Guenee, 1841)
Euclidia mi (Clerck, 1759)
Euclidia glyphica (Linnaeus, 1758)
Euclidia triquetra (Denis & Schiffermüller, 1775)
Euplagia quadripunctaria (Poda, 1761)
Euproctis chrysorrhoea (Linnaeus, 1758)
Euproctis similis (Fuessly, 1775)
Exophyla rectangularis (Geyer, 1828)
Grammodes bifasciata (Petagna, 1787)
Grammodes stolida (Fabricius, 1775)
Herminia grisealis (Denis & Schiffermüller, 1775)
Herminia tarsicrinalis (Knoch, 1782)
Herminia tarsipennalis (Treitschke, 1835)
Herminia tenuialis (Rebel, 1899)
Hypena crassalis (Fabricius, 1787)
Hypena obesalis Treitschke, 1829
Hypena obsitalis (Hübner, 1813)
Hypena palpalis (Hübner, 1796)
Hypena proboscidalis (Linnaeus, 1758)
Hypena rostralis (Linnaeus, 1758)
Hypenodes humidalis Doubleday, 1850
Hypenodes kalchbergi Staudinger, 1876
Hyphantria cunea (Drury, 1773)
Hyphoraia aulica (Linnaeus, 1758)
Idia calvaria (Denis & Schiffermüller, 1775)
Laelia coenosa (Hübner, 1808)
Laspeyria flexula (Denis & Schiffermüller, 1775)
Leucoma salicis (Linnaeus, 1758)
Lithosia quadra (Linnaeus, 1758)
Lygephila craccae (Denis & Schiffermüller, 1775)
Lygephila lusoria (Linnaeus, 1758)
Lygephila pastinum (Treitschke, 1826)
Lygephila procax (Hübner, 1813)
Lygephila viciae (Hübner, 1822)
Lymantria dispar (Linnaeus, 1758)
Lymantria monacha (Linnaeus, 1758)
Metachrostis dardouini (Boisduval, 1840)
Metachrostis velox (Hübner, 1813)
Miltochrista miniata (Forster, 1771)
Minucia lunaris (Denis & Schiffermüller, 1775)
Nodaria nodosalis (Herrich-Schäffer, 1851)
Nudaria mundana (Linnaeus, 1761)
Ocneria rubea (Denis & Schiffermüller, 1775)
Odice arcuinna (Hübner, 1790)
Odice suava (Hübner, 1813)
Ophiusa tirhaca (Cramer, 1773)
Orectis proboscidata (Herrich-Schäffer, 1851)
Orgyia recens (Hübner, 1819)
Orgyia antiqua (Linnaeus, 1758)
Paracolax tristalis (Fabricius, 1794)
Parascotia fuliginaria (Linnaeus, 1761)
Parasemia plantaginis (Linnaeus, 1758)
Parocneria detrita (Esper, 1785)
Pechipogo plumigeralis Hübner, 1825
Pechipogo strigilata (Linnaeus, 1758)
Pelosia muscerda (Hufnagel, 1766)
Pelosia obtusa (Herrich-Schäffer, 1852)
Penthophera morio (Linnaeus, 1767)
Pericallia matronula (Linnaeus, 1758)
Phragmatobia fuliginosa (Linnaeus, 1758)
Phragmatobia luctifera (Denis & Schiffermüller, 1775)
Phytometra amata (Butler, 1879)
Phytometra viridaria (Clerck, 1759)
Polypogon gryphalis (Herrich-Schäffer, 1851)
Polypogon tentacularia (Linnaeus, 1758)
Rhypagla lacernaria (Hübner, 1813)
Rhyparia purpurata (Linnaeus, 1758)
Rivula sericealis (Scopoli, 1763)
Schrankia costaestrigalis (Stephens, 1834)
Schrankia taenialis (Hübner, 1809)
Scoliopteryx libatrix (Linnaeus, 1758)
Setina irrorella (Linnaeus, 1758)
Simplicia rectalis (Eversmann, 1842)
Spilosoma lubricipeda (Linnaeus, 1758)
Spilosoma lutea (Hufnagel, 1766)
Spilosoma urticae (Esper, 1789)
Tathorhynchus exsiccata (Lederer, 1855)
Thumatha senex (Hübner, 1808)
Trisateles emortualis (Denis & Schiffermüller, 1775)
Tyria jacobaeae (Linnaeus, 1758)
Zanclognatha zelleralis (Wocke, 1850)
Zebeeba falsalis (Herrich-Schäffer, 1839)
Zekelita antiqualis (Hübner, 1809)
Zethes insularis Rambur, 1833

Euteliidae
Eutelia adoratrix (Staudinger, 1892)
Eutelia adulatrix (Hübner, 1813)

Gelechiidae
Acompsia cinerella (Clerck, 1759)
Acompsia maculosella (Stainton, 1851)
Acompsia minorella Rebel, 1899
Acompsia tripunctella (Denis & Schiffermüller, 1775)
Altenia scriptella (Hübner, 1796)
Anacampsis populella (Clerck, 1759)
Aproaerema anthyllidella (Hübner, 1813)
Aristotelia decurtella (Hübner, 1813)
Aristotelia subericinella (Duponchel, 1843)
Aroga velocella (Duponchel, 1838)
Athrips mouffetella (Linnaeus, 1758)
Athrips nigricostella (Duponchel, 1842)
Athrips patockai (Povolny, 1979)
Athrips rancidella (Herrich-Schäffer, 1854)
Brachmia dimidiella (Denis & Schiffermüller, 1775)
Bryotropha senectella (Zeller, 1839)
Bryotropha terrella (Denis & Schiffermüller, 1775)
Carpatolechia alburnella (Zeller, 1839)
Carpatolechia decorella (Haworth, 1812)
Carpatolechia notatella (Hübner, 1813)
Carpatolechia proximella (Hübner, 1796)
Caryocolum alsinella (Zeller, 1868)
Caryocolum blandella (Douglas, 1852)
Caryocolum cauligenella (Schmid, 1863)
Caryocolum junctella (Douglas, 1851)
Caryocolum laceratella (Zeller, 1868)
Caryocolum leucomelanella (Zeller, 1839)
Caryocolum marmorea (Haworth, 1828)
Caryocolum moehringiae (Klimesch, 1954)
Caryocolum mucronatella (Chretien, 1900)
Caryocolum peregrinella (Herrich-Schäffer, 1854)
Caryocolum petryi (O. Hofmann, 1899)
Caryocolum proxima (Haworth, 1828)
Caryocolum repentis Huemer & Luquet, 1992
Caryocolum saginella (Zeller, 1868)
Caryocolum schleichi (Christoph, 1872)
Caryocolum tischeriella (Zeller, 1839)
Caryocolum trauniella (Zeller, 1868)
Caryocolum tricolorella (Haworth, 1812)
Caryocolum vicinella (Douglas, 1851)
Chionodes continuella (Zeller, 1839)
Chionodes distinctella (Zeller, 1839)
Chionodes electella (Zeller, 1839)
Chionodes fumatella (Douglas, 1850)
Chionodes lugubrella (Fabricius, 1794)
Chionodes nebulosella (Heinemann, 1870)
Chionodes perpetuella (Herrich-Schäffer, 1854)
Chionodes tragicella (Heyden, 1865)
Chionodes viduella (Fabricius, 1794)
Chrysoesthia sexguttella (Thunberg, 1794)
Dichomeris ustalella (Fabricius, 1794)
Exoteleia dodecella (Linnaeus, 1758)
Exoteleia succinctella (Zeller, 1872)
Gelechia asinella (Hübner, 1796)
Gelechia cuneatella Douglas, 1852
Gelechia nigra (Haworth, 1828)
Gelechia rhombella (Denis & Schiffermüller, 1775)
Gelechia sororculella (Hübner, 1817)
Gelechia turpella (Denis & Schiffermüller, 1775)
Gnorimoschema hoefneri (Rebel, 1909)
Gnorimoschema streliciella (Herrich-Schäffer, 1854)
Lutilabria lutilabrella (Mann, 1857)
Megacraspedus albovenata Junnilainen, 2010
Mirificarma cytisella (Treitschke, 1833)
Mirificarma eburnella (Denis & Schiffermüller, 1775)
Mirificarma lentiginosella (Zeller, 1839)
Mirificarma maculatella (Hübner, 1796)
Neofriseria peliella (Treitschke, 1835)
Neotelphusa sequax (Haworth, 1828)
Paranarsia joannisiella Ragonot, 1895
Pseudotelphusa paripunctella (Thunberg, 1794)
Pseudotelphusa scalella (Scopoli, 1763)
Pseudotelphusa tessella (Linnaeus, 1758)
Psoricoptera gibbosella (Zeller, 1839)
Recurvaria nanella (Denis & Schiffermüller, 1775)
Sattleria triglavica Povolny, 1987
Scrobipalpa acuminatella (Sircom, 1850)
Scrobipalpa artemisiella (Treitschke, 1833)
Scrobipalpa atriplicella (Fischer von Röslerstamm, 1841)
Scrobipalpa kasyi Povolny, 1968
Scrobipalpa murinella (Duponchel, 1843)
Scrobipalpa ocellatella (Boyd, 1858)
Scrobipalpa perinii (Klimesch, 1951)
Scrobipalpa skulei Huemer & Karsholt, 2010
Scrobipalpopsis petasitis (Pfaffenzeller, 1867)
Scrobipalpula tussilaginis (Stainton, 1867)
Sophronia ascalis Gozmany, 1951
Sophronia sicariellus (Zeller, 1839)
Syncopacma cinctella (Clerck, 1759)
Syncopacma taeniolella (Zeller, 1839)
Teleiodes luculella (Hübner, 1813)
Teleiodes saltuum (Zeller, 1878)
Teleiopsis albifemorella (E. Hofmann, 1867)

Geometridae
Abraxas grossulariata (Linnaeus, 1758)
Abraxas sylvata (Scopoli, 1763)
Acasis appensata (Eversmann, 1842)
Acasis viretata (Hübner, 1799)
Aethalura punctulata (Denis & Schiffermüller, 1775)
Agriopis aurantiaria (Hübner, 1799)
Agriopis bajaria (Denis & Schiffermüller, 1775)
Agriopis leucophaearia (Denis & Schiffermüller, 1775)
Agriopis marginaria (Fabricius, 1776)
Alcis bastelbergeri (Hirschke, 1908)
Alcis jubata (Thunberg, 1788)
Alcis repandata (Linnaeus, 1758)
Aleucis distinctata (Herrich-Schäffer, 1839)
Alsophila aceraria (Denis & Schiffermüller, 1775)
Alsophila aescularia (Denis & Schiffermüller, 1775)
Angerona prunaria (Linnaeus, 1758)
Anticlea derivata (Denis & Schiffermüller, 1775)
Anticollix sparsata (Treitschke, 1828)
Apeira syringaria (Linnaeus, 1758)
Aplasta ononaria (Fuessly, 1783)
Aplocera efformata (Guenee, 1858)
Aplocera plagiata (Linnaeus, 1758)
Aplocera praeformata (Hübner, 1826)
Aplocera simpliciata (Treitschke, 1835)
Apocheima hispidaria (Denis & Schiffermüller, 1775)
Archiearis parthenias (Linnaeus, 1761)
Artiora evonymaria (Denis & Schiffermüller, 1775)
Ascotis selenaria (Denis & Schiffermüller, 1775)
Aspitates ochrearia (Rossi, 1794)
Asthena albulata (Hufnagel, 1767)
Asthena anseraria (Herrich-Schäffer, 1855)
Baptria tibiale (Esper, 1791)
Biston betularia (Linnaeus, 1758)
Biston strataria (Hufnagel, 1767)
Boudinotiana notha (Hübner, 1803)
Bupalus piniaria (Linnaeus, 1758)
Cabera exanthemata (Scopoli, 1763)
Cabera pusaria (Linnaeus, 1758)
Campaea honoraria (Denis & Schiffermüller, 1775)
Campaea margaritaria (Linnaeus, 1761)
Camptogramma bilineata (Linnaeus, 1758)
Camptogramma scripturata (Hübner, 1799)
Cataclysme riguata (Hübner, 1813)
Catarhoe cuculata (Hufnagel, 1767)
Catarhoe rubidata (Denis & Schiffermüller, 1775)
Cepphis advenaria (Hübner, 1790)
Charissa certhiatus (Rebel & Zerny, 1931)
Charissa obscurata (Denis & Schiffermüller, 1775)
Charissa pullata (Denis & Schiffermüller, 1775)
Charissa variegata (Duponchel, 1830)
Charissa ambiguata (Duponchel, 1830)
Charissa supinaria (Mann, 1854)
Charissa glaucinaria (Hübner, 1799)
Chesias capriata Prout, 1904
Chesias rufata (Fabricius, 1775)
Chiasmia aestimaria (Hübner, 1809)
Chiasmia clathrata (Linnaeus, 1758)
Chlorissa cloraria (Hübner, 1813)
Chlorissa viridata (Linnaeus, 1758)
Chloroclysta miata (Linnaeus, 1758)
Chloroclysta siterata (Hufnagel, 1767)
Chloroclystis v-ata (Haworth, 1809)
Cidaria fulvata (Forster, 1771)
Cleora cinctaria (Denis & Schiffermüller, 1775)
Cleorodes lichenaria (Hufnagel, 1767)
Coenocalpe lapidata (Hübner, 1809)
Coenotephria ablutaria (Boisduval, 1840)
Coenotephria salicata (Denis & Schiffermüller, 1775)
Coenotephria tophaceata (Denis & Schiffermüller, 1775)
Colostygia aptata (Hübner, 1813)
Colostygia aqueata (Hübner, 1813)
Colostygia austriacaria (Herrich-Schäffer, 1852)
Colostygia kollariaria (Herrich-Schäffer, 1848)
Colostygia olivata (Denis & Schiffermüller, 1775)
Colostygia pectinataria (Knoch, 1781)
Colostygia sericeata (Schwingenschuss, 1926)
Colostygia tempestaria (Herrich-Schäffer, 1852)
Colostygia turbata (Hübner, 1799)
Colotois pennaria (Linnaeus, 1761)
Comibaena bajularia (Denis & Schiffermüller, 1775)
Cosmorhoe ocellata (Linnaeus, 1758)
Costaconvexa polygrammata (Borkhausen, 1794)
Crocallis elinguaria (Linnaeus, 1758)
Crocallis tusciaria (Borkhausen, 1793)
Cyclophora linearia (Hübner, 1799)
Cyclophora porata (Linnaeus, 1767)
Cyclophora punctaria (Linnaeus, 1758)
Cyclophora suppunctaria (Zeller, 1847)
Cyclophora albiocellaria (Hübner, 1789)
Cyclophora albipunctata (Hufnagel, 1767)
Cyclophora annularia (Fabricius, 1775)
Cyclophora pendularia (Clerck, 1759)
Cyclophora puppillaria (Hübner, 1799)
Cyclophora quercimontaria (Bastelberger, 1897)
Cyclophora ruficiliaria (Herrich-Schäffer, 1855)
Deileptenia ribeata (Clerck, 1759)
Dyscia raunaria (Freyer, 1852)
Dysstroma citrata (Linnaeus, 1761)
Dysstroma truncata (Hufnagel, 1767)
Earophila badiata (Denis & Schiffermüller, 1775)
Ecliptopera capitata (Herrich-Schäffer, 1839)
Ecliptopera silaceata (Denis & Schiffermüller, 1775)
Ectropis crepuscularia (Denis & Schiffermüller, 1775)
Electrophaes corylata (Thunberg, 1792)
Elophos caelibaria (Heydenreich, 1851)
Elophos zelleraria (Freyer, 1836)
Elophos dilucidaria (Denis & Schiffermüller, 1775)
Elophos serotinaria (Denis & Schiffermüller, 1775)
Elophos vittaria (Thunberg, 1788)
Ematurga atomaria (Linnaeus, 1758)
Emmiltis pygmaearia (Hübner, 1809)
Ennomos alniaria (Linnaeus, 1758)
Ennomos autumnaria (Werneburg, 1859)
Ennomos erosaria (Denis & Schiffermüller, 1775)
Ennomos fuscantaria (Haworth, 1809)
Ennomos quercinaria (Hufnagel, 1767)
Entephria caesiata (Denis & Schiffermüller, 1775)
Entephria cyanata (Hübner, 1809)
Entephria flavata (Osthelder, 1929)
Entephria flavicinctata (Hübner, 1813)
Entephria infidaria (de La Harpe, 1853)
Entephria nobiliaria (Herrich-Schäffer, 1852)
Epione repandaria (Hufnagel, 1767)
Epione vespertaria (Linnaeus, 1767)
Epirrhoe alternata (Muller, 1764)
Epirrhoe galiata (Denis & Schiffermüller, 1775)
Epirrhoe hastulata (Hübner, 1790)
Epirrhoe molluginata (Hübner, 1813)
Epirrhoe rivata (Hübner, 1813)
Epirrhoe tristata (Linnaeus, 1758)
Epirrita autumnata (Borkhausen, 1794)
Epirrita christyi (Allen, 1906)
Epirrita dilutata (Denis & Schiffermüller, 1775)
Erannis ankeraria (Staudinger, 1861)
Erannis defoliaria (Clerck, 1759)
Euchoeca nebulata (Scopoli, 1763)
Eucrostes indigenata (de Villers, 1789)
Eulithis populata (Linnaeus, 1758)
Eulithis prunata (Linnaeus, 1758)
Eumannia oppositaria (Mann, 1864)
Euphyia adumbraria (Herrich-Schäffer, 1852)
Euphyia biangulata (Haworth, 1809)
Euphyia frustata (Treitschke, 1828)
Euphyia mesembrina (Rebel, 1927)
Euphyia unangulata (Haworth, 1809)
Eupithecia abbreviata Stephens, 1831
Eupithecia abietaria (Goeze, 1781)
Eupithecia absinthiata (Clerck, 1759)
Eupithecia actaeata Walderdorff, 1869
Eupithecia alliaria Staudinger, 1870
Eupithecia analoga Djakonov, 1926
Eupithecia assimilata Doubleday, 1856
Eupithecia carpophagata Staudinger, 1871
Eupithecia cauchiata (Duponchel, 1831)
Eupithecia centaureata (Denis & Schiffermüller, 1775)
Eupithecia conterminata (Lienig, 1846)
Eupithecia cretaceata (Packard, 1874)
Eupithecia cuculliaria (Rebel, 1901)
Eupithecia denotata (Hübner, 1813)
Eupithecia distinctaria Herrich-Schäffer, 1848
Eupithecia dodoneata Guenee, 1858
Eupithecia druentiata Dietze, 1902
Eupithecia egenaria Herrich-Schäffer, 1848
Eupithecia ericeata (Rambur, 1833)
Eupithecia exiguata (Hübner, 1813)
Eupithecia expallidata Doubleday, 1856
Eupithecia extraversaria Herrich-Schäffer, 1852
Eupithecia gemellata Herrich-Schäffer, 1861
Eupithecia graphata (Treitschke, 1828)
Eupithecia gratiosata Herrich-Schäffer, 1861
Eupithecia gueneata Milliere, 1862
Eupithecia haworthiata Doubleday, 1856
Eupithecia icterata (de Villers, 1789)
Eupithecia immundata (Lienig, 1846)
Eupithecia impurata (Hübner, 1813)
Eupithecia indigata (Hübner, 1813)
Eupithecia innotata (Hufnagel, 1767)
Eupithecia insigniata (Hübner, 1790)
Eupithecia intricata (Zetterstedt, 1839)
Eupithecia inturbata (Hübner, 1817)
Eupithecia irriguata (Hübner, 1813)
Eupithecia lanceata (Hübner, 1825)
Eupithecia laquaearia Herrich-Schäffer, 1848
Eupithecia lariciata (Freyer, 1841)
Eupithecia limbata Staudinger, 1879
Eupithecia linariata (Denis & Schiffermüller, 1775)
Eupithecia millefoliata Rossler, 1866
Eupithecia nanata (Hübner, 1813)
Eupithecia ochridata Schutze & Pinker, 1968
Eupithecia oxycedrata (Rambur, 1833)
Eupithecia pauxillaria Boisduval, 1840
Eupithecia pernotata Guenee, 1858
Eupithecia pimpinellata (Hübner, 1813)
Eupithecia plumbeolata (Haworth, 1809)
Eupithecia pulchellata Stephens, 1831
Eupithecia pusillata (Denis & Schiffermüller, 1775)
Eupithecia pyreneata Mabille, 1871
Eupithecia riparia Herrich-Schäffer, 1851
Eupithecia satyrata (Hübner, 1813)
Eupithecia schiefereri Bohatsch, 1893
Eupithecia selinata Herrich-Schäffer, 1861
Eupithecia semigraphata Bruand, 1850
Eupithecia silenata Assmann, 1848
Eupithecia simpliciata (Haworth, 1809)
Eupithecia sinuosaria (Eversmann, 1848)
Eupithecia subfuscata (Haworth, 1809)
Eupithecia subumbrata (Denis & Schiffermüller, 1775)
Eupithecia succenturiata (Linnaeus, 1758)
Eupithecia tantillaria Boisduval, 1840
Eupithecia tenuiata (Hübner, 1813)
Eupithecia tripunctaria Herrich-Schäffer, 1852
Eupithecia trisignaria Herrich-Schäffer, 1848
Eupithecia undata (Freyer, 1840)
Eupithecia valerianata (Hübner, 1813)
Eupithecia venosata (Fabricius, 1787)
Eupithecia veratraria Herrich-Schäffer, 1848
Eupithecia virgaureata Doubleday, 1861
Eupithecia vulgata (Haworth, 1809)
Eustroma reticulata (Denis & Schiffermüller, 1775)
Fagivorina arenaria (Hufnagel, 1767)
Gagitodes sagittata (Fabricius, 1787)
Gandaritis pyraliata (Denis & Schiffermüller, 1775)
Geometra papilionaria (Linnaeus, 1758)
Glacies alpinata (Scopoli, 1763)
Glacies coracina (Esper, 1805)
Glacies noricana (Wagner, 1898)
Glacies spitzi (Rebel, 1906)
Gnophos furvata (Denis & Schiffermüller, 1775)
Gnophos obfuscata (Denis & Schiffermüller, 1775)
Gnophos dumetata Treitschke, 1827
Gymnoscelis rufifasciata (Haworth, 1809)
Heliomata glarearia (Denis & Schiffermüller, 1775)
Hemistola chrysoprasaria (Esper, 1795)
Hemithea aestivaria (Hübner, 1789)
Horisme aemulata (Hübner, 1813)
Horisme aquata (Hübner, 1813)
Horisme calligraphata (Herrich-Schäffer, 1838)
Horisme corticata (Treitschke, 1835)
Horisme radicaria (de La Harpe, 1855)
Horisme tersata (Denis & Schiffermüller, 1775)
Horisme vitalbata (Denis & Schiffermüller, 1775)
Hydrelia flammeolaria (Hufnagel, 1767)
Hydrelia sylvata (Denis & Schiffermüller, 1775)
Hydria cervinalis (Scopoli, 1763)
Hydria undulata (Linnaeus, 1758)
Hydriomena furcata (Thunberg, 1784)
Hydriomena impluviata (Denis & Schiffermüller, 1775)
Hydriomena ruberata (Freyer, 1831)
Hylaea fasciaria (Linnaeus, 1758)
Hypomecis danieli (Wehrli, 1932)
Hypomecis punctinalis (Scopoli, 1763)
Hypomecis roboraria (Denis & Schiffermüller, 1775)
Hypoxystis pluviaria (Fabricius, 1787)
Idaea aureolaria (Denis & Schiffermüller, 1775)
Idaea aversata (Linnaeus, 1758)
Idaea biselata (Hufnagel, 1767)
Idaea camparia (Herrich-Schäffer, 1852)
Idaea degeneraria (Hübner, 1799)
Idaea deversaria (Herrich-Schäffer, 1847)
Idaea dilutaria (Hübner, 1799)
Idaea dimidiata (Hufnagel, 1767)
Idaea distinctaria (Boisduval, 1840)
Idaea elongaria (Rambur, 1833)
Idaea emarginata (Linnaeus, 1758)
Idaea filicata (Hübner, 1799)
Idaea flaveolaria (Hübner, 1809)
Idaea fuscovenosa (Goeze, 1781)
Idaea humiliata (Hufnagel, 1767)
Idaea inquinata (Scopoli, 1763)
Idaea laevigata (Scopoli, 1763)
Idaea moniliata (Denis & Schiffermüller, 1775)
Idaea muricata (Hufnagel, 1767)
Idaea nitidata (Herrich-Schäffer, 1861)
Idaea obsoletaria (Rambur, 1833)
Idaea ochrata (Scopoli, 1763)
Idaea pallidata (Denis & Schiffermüller, 1775)
Idaea politaria (Hübner, 1799)
Idaea rubraria (Staudinger, 1901)
Idaea rufaria (Hübner, 1799)
Idaea rusticata (Denis & Schiffermüller, 1775)
Idaea seriata (Schrank, 1802)
Idaea sericeata (Hübner, 1813)
Idaea serpentata (Hufnagel, 1767)
Idaea straminata (Borkhausen, 1794)
Idaea subsericeata (Haworth, 1809)
Idaea sylvestraria (Hübner, 1799)
Idaea trigeminata (Haworth, 1809)
Idaea typicata (Guenee, 1858)
Isturgia arenacearia (Denis & Schiffermüller, 1775)
Isturgia limbaria (Fabricius, 1775)
Isturgia murinaria (Denis & Schiffermüller, 1775)
Isturgia roraria (Fabricius, 1776)
Jodis lactearia (Linnaeus, 1758)
Jodis putata (Linnaeus, 1758)
Lampropteryx suffumata (Denis & Schiffermüller, 1775)
Ligdia adustata (Denis & Schiffermüller, 1775)
Lobophora halterata (Hufnagel, 1767)
Lomaspilis marginata (Linnaeus, 1758)
Lomaspilis opis Butler, 1878
Lomographa bimaculata (Fabricius, 1775)
Lomographa temerata (Denis & Schiffermüller, 1775)
Lycia alpina (Sulzer, 1776)
Lycia florentina (Stefanelli, 1882)
Lycia graecarius (Staudinger, 1861)
Lycia hirtaria (Clerck, 1759)
Lythria cruentaria (Hufnagel, 1767)
Lythria purpuraria (Linnaeus, 1758)
Macaria alternata (Denis & Schiffermüller, 1775)
Macaria artesiaria (Denis & Schiffermüller, 1775)
Macaria brunneata (Thunberg, 1784)
Macaria liturata (Clerck, 1759)
Macaria notata (Linnaeus, 1758)
Macaria signaria (Hübner, 1809)
Macaria wauaria (Linnaeus, 1758)
Martania taeniata (Stephens, 1831)
Melanthia alaudaria (Freyer, 1846)
Melanthia procellata (Denis & Schiffermüller, 1775)
Menophra abruptaria (Thunberg, 1792)
Mesoleuca albicillata (Linnaeus, 1758)
Mesotype didymata (Linnaeus, 1758)
Mesotype parallelolineata (Retzius, 1783)
Mesotype verberata (Scopoli, 1763)
Microloxia herbaria (Hübner, 1813)
Minoa murinata (Scopoli, 1763)
Nebula achromaria (de La Harpe, 1853)
Nebula nebulata (Treitschke, 1828)
Nothocasis sertata (Hübner, 1817)
Nychiodes dalmatina Wagner, 1909
Nychiodes obscuraria (de Villers, 1789)
Nycterosea obstipata (Fabricius, 1794)
Odezia atrata (Linnaeus, 1758)
Odontopera bidentata (Clerck, 1759)
Operophtera brumata (Linnaeus, 1758)
Operophtera fagata (Scharfenberg, 1805)
Opisthograptis luteolata (Linnaeus, 1758)
Orthonama vittata (Borkhausen, 1794)
Ourapteryx sambucaria (Linnaeus, 1758)
Pachycnemia hippocastanaria (Hübner, 1799)
Paradarisa consonaria (Hübner, 1799)
Parectropis similaria (Hufnagel, 1767)
Pareulype berberata (Denis & Schiffermüller, 1775)
Pasiphila chloerata (Mabille, 1870)
Pasiphila debiliata (Hübner, 1817)
Pasiphila rectangulata (Linnaeus, 1758)
Pelurga comitata (Linnaeus, 1758)
Pennithera firmata (Hübner, 1822)
Pennithera ulicata (Rambur, 1934)
Perconia strigillaria (Hübner, 1787)
Peribatodes rhomboidaria (Denis & Schiffermüller, 1775)
Peribatodes secundaria (Denis & Schiffermüller, 1775)
Peribatodes umbraria (Hübner, 1809)
Perizoma affinitata (Stephens, 1831)
Perizoma albulata (Denis & Schiffermüller, 1775)
Perizoma alchemillata (Linnaeus, 1758)
Perizoma bifaciata (Haworth, 1809)
Perizoma blandiata (Denis & Schiffermüller, 1775)
Perizoma flavofasciata (Thunberg, 1792)
Perizoma hydrata (Treitschke, 1829)
Perizoma incultaria (Herrich-Schäffer, 1848)
Perizoma lugdunaria (Herrich-Schäffer, 1855)
Perizoma minorata (Treitschke, 1828)
Perizoma obsoletata (Herrich-Schäffer, 1838)
Petrophora chlorosata (Scopoli, 1763)
Phaiogramma etruscaria (Zeller, 1849)
Phibalapteryx virgata (Hufnagel, 1767)
Phigalia pilosaria (Denis & Schiffermüller, 1775)
Philereme transversata (Hufnagel, 1767)
Philereme vetulata (Denis & Schiffermüller, 1775)
Plagodis dolabraria (Linnaeus, 1767)
Plagodis pulveraria (Linnaeus, 1758)
Plemyria rubiginata (Denis & Schiffermüller, 1775)
Pseudopanthera macularia (Linnaeus, 1758)
Pseudoterpna pruinata (Hufnagel, 1767)
Psodos quadrifaria (Sulzer, 1776)
Pterapherapteryx sexalata (Retzius, 1783)
Pungeleria capreolaria (Denis & Schiffermüller, 1775)
Rheumaptera hastata (Linnaeus, 1758)
Rheumaptera subhastata (Nolcken, 1870)
Rhodometra sacraria (Linnaeus, 1767)
Rhodostrophia calabra (Petagna, 1786)
Rhodostrophia vibicaria (Clerck, 1759)
Schistostege decussata (Denis & Schiffermüller, 1775)
Sciadia slovenica Leraut, 2008
Sciadia tenebraria (Esper, 1806)
Scopula confinaria (Herrich-Schäffer, 1847)
Scopula emutaria (Hübner, 1809)
Scopula flaccidaria (Zeller, 1852)
Scopula floslactata (Haworth, 1809)
Scopula imitaria (Hübner, 1799)
Scopula immutata (Linnaeus, 1758)
Scopula incanata (Linnaeus, 1758)
Scopula marginepunctata (Goeze, 1781)
Scopula subpunctaria (Herrich-Schäffer, 1847)
Scopula ternata Schrank, 1802
Scopula caricaria (Reutti, 1853)
Scopula decorata (Denis & Schiffermüller, 1775)
Scopula immorata (Linnaeus, 1758)
Scopula nemoraria (Hübner, 1799)
Scopula nigropunctata (Hufnagel, 1767)
Scopula ornata (Scopoli, 1763)
Scopula rubiginata (Hufnagel, 1767)
Scopula submutata (Treitschke, 1828)
Scopula umbelaria (Hübner, 1813)
Scopula virgulata (Denis & Schiffermüller, 1775)
Scotopteryx bipunctaria (Denis & Schiffermüller, 1775)
Scotopteryx chenopodiata (Linnaeus, 1758)
Scotopteryx coarctaria (Denis & Schiffermüller, 1775)
Scotopteryx ignorata Huemer & Hausmann, 1998
Scotopteryx luridata (Hufnagel, 1767)
Scotopteryx moeniata (Scopoli, 1763)
Scotopteryx mucronata (Scopoli, 1763)
Scotopteryx vicinaria (Duponchel, 1830)
Selenia dentaria (Fabricius, 1775)
Selenia lunularia (Hübner, 1788)
Selenia tetralunaria (Hufnagel, 1767)
Selidosema plumaria (Denis & Schiffermüller, 1775)
Siona lineata (Scopoli, 1763)
Spargania luctuata (Denis & Schiffermüller, 1775)
Stegania cararia (Hübner, 1790)
Stegania dilectaria (Hübner, 1790)
Stegania trimaculata (de Villers, 1789)
Synopsia sociaria (Hübner, 1799)
Tephronia sepiaria (Hufnagel, 1767)
Thalera fimbrialis (Scopoli, 1763)
Thera britannica (Turner, 1925)
Thera cognata (Thunberg, 1792)
Thera cupressata (Geyer, 1831)
Thera juniperata (Linnaeus, 1758)
Thera obeliscata (Hübner, 1787)
Thera variata (Denis & Schiffermüller, 1775)
Thera vetustata (Denis & Schiffermüller, 1775)
Theria rupicapraria (Denis & Schiffermüller, 1775)
Thetidia smaragdaria (Fabricius, 1787)
Timandra comae Schmidt, 1931
Trichopteryx carpinata (Borkhausen, 1794)
Trichopteryx polycommata (Denis & Schiffermüller, 1775)
Triphosa dubitata (Linnaeus, 1758)
Triphosa sabaudiata (Duponchel, 1830)
Venusia blomeri (Curtis, 1832)
Venusia cambrica Curtis, 1839
Xanthorhoe biriviata (Borkhausen, 1794)
Xanthorhoe designata (Hufnagel, 1767)
Xanthorhoe ferrugata (Clerck, 1759)
Xanthorhoe fluctuata (Linnaeus, 1758)
Xanthorhoe incursata (Hübner, 1813)
Xanthorhoe montanata (Denis & Schiffermüller, 1775)
Xanthorhoe quadrifasiata (Clerck, 1759)
Xanthorhoe spadicearia (Denis & Schiffermüller, 1775)
Xenochlorodes olympiaria (Herrich-Schäffer, 1852)

Glyphipterigidae
Acrolepiopsis assectella (Zeller, 1839)
Digitivalva granitella (Treitschke, 1833)
Digitivalva orientella (Klimesch, 1956)
Digitivalva pulicariae (Klimesch, 1956)

Gracillariidae
Aspilapteryx limosella (Duponchel, 1843)
Callisto basistrigella Huemer, Deutsch & Triberti, 2015
Calybites magnifica (Stainton, 1867)
Cameraria ohridella Deschka & Dimic, 1986
Gracillaria syringella (Fabricius, 1794)
Micrurapteryx kollariella (Zeller, 1839)
Parornix carpinella (Frey, 1863)
Parornix devoniella (Stainton, 1850)
Phyllonorycter cerasicolella (Herrich-Schäffer, 1855)
Phyllonorycter coryli (Nicelli, 1851)
Phyllonorycter joannisi (Le Marchand, 1936)
Phyllonorycter nicellii (Stainton, 1851)
Phyllonorycter populifoliella (Treitschke, 1833)
Phyllonorycter spinicolella (Zeller, 1846)
Phyllonorycter stettinensis (Nicelli, 1852)
Phyllonorycter tenerella (de Joannis, 1915)

Heliozelidae
Holocacista rivillei (Stainton, 1855)

Heterogynidae
Heterogynis penella (Hübner, 1819)

Incurvariidae
Incurvaria triglavensis Hauder, 1912
Incurvaria vetulella (Zetterstedt, 1839)

Lasiocampidae
Cosmotriche lobulina (Denis & Schiffermüller, 1775)
Dendrolimus pini (Linnaeus, 1758)
Eriogaster catax (Linnaeus, 1758)
Eriogaster lanestris (Linnaeus, 1758)
Eriogaster rimicola (Denis & Schiffermüller, 1775)
Gastropacha quercifolia (Linnaeus, 1758)
Gastropacha populifolia (Denis & Schiffermüller, 1775)
Lasiocampa quercus (Linnaeus, 1758)
Lasiocampa trifolii (Denis & Schiffermüller, 1775)
Macrothylacia rubi (Linnaeus, 1758)
Malacosoma castrensis (Linnaeus, 1758)
Malacosoma neustria (Linnaeus, 1758)
Odonestis pruni (Linnaeus, 1758)
Phyllodesma tremulifolia (Hübner, 1810)
Poecilocampa alpina (Frey & Wullschlegel, 1874)
Poecilocampa populi (Linnaeus, 1758)
Trichiura crataegi (Linnaeus, 1758)

Lecithoceridae
Lecithocera nigrana (Duponchel, 1836)

Limacodidae
Apoda limacodes (Hufnagel, 1766)
Heterogenea asella (Denis & Schiffermüller, 1775)

Lypusidae
Lypusa tokari Elsner, Liska & Petru, 2008
Pseudatemelia flavifrontella (Denis & Schiffermüller, 1775)
Pseudatemelia synchrozella (Jackh, 1959)
Pseudatemelia josephinae (Toll, 1956)

Micropterigidae
Micropterix allionella (Fabricius, 1794)
Micropterix aruncella (Scopoli, 1763)
Micropterix aureatella (Scopoli, 1763)
Micropterix aureoviridella (Hofner, 1898)
Micropterix calthella (Linnaeus, 1761)
Micropterix corcyrella Walsingham, 1919
Micropterix croatica Heath & Kaltenbach, 1984
Micropterix facetella Zeller, 1850
Micropterix igaloensis Amsel, 1951
Micropterix rothenbachii Frey, 1856

Momphidae
Mompha miscella (Denis & Schiffermüller, 1775)

Nepticulidae
Acalyptris minimella (Rebel, 1924)
Acalyptris platani (Muller-Rutz, 1934)
Bohemannia pulverosella (Stainton, 1849)
Ectoedemia agrimoniae (Frey, 1858)
Ectoedemia albifasciella (Heinemann, 1871)
Ectoedemia angulifasciella (Stainton, 1849)
Ectoedemia arcuatella (Herrich-Schäffer, 1855)
Ectoedemia argyropeza (Zeller, 1839)
Ectoedemia atricollis (Stainton, 1857)
Ectoedemia caradjai (Groschke, 1944)
Ectoedemia erythrogenella (de Joannis, 1908)
Ectoedemia hannoverella (Glitz, 1872)
Ectoedemia heringi (Toll, 1934)
Ectoedemia intimella (Zeller, 1848)
Ectoedemia klimeschi (Skala, 1933)
Ectoedemia mahalebella (Klimesch, 1936)
Ectoedemia occultella (Linnaeus, 1767)
Ectoedemia rubivora (Wocke, 1860)
Ectoedemia spinosella (de Joannis, 1908)
Ectoedemia subbimaculella (Haworth, 1828)
Ectoedemia turbidella (Zeller, 1848)
Ectoedemia decentella (Herrich-Schäffer, 1855)
Ectoedemia louisella (Sircom, 1849)
Ectoedemia sericopeza (Zeller, 1839)
Ectoedemia septembrella (Stainton, 1849)
Ectoedemia amani Svensson, 1966
Ectoedemia atrifrontella (Stainton, 1851)
Enteucha acetosae (Stainton, 1854)
Parafomoria helianthemella (Herrich-Schäffer, 1860)
Simplimorpha promissa (Staudinger, 1871)
Stigmella aceris (Frey, 1857)
Stigmella aeneofasciella (Herrich-Schäffer, 1855)
Stigmella alnetella (Stainton, 1856)
Stigmella anomalella (Goeze, 1783)
Stigmella assimilella (Zeller, 1848)
Stigmella atricapitella (Haworth, 1828)
Stigmella aurella (Fabricius, 1775)
Stigmella basiguttella (Heinemann, 1862)
Stigmella betulicola (Stainton, 1856)
Stigmella carpinella (Heinemann, 1862)
Stigmella catharticella (Stainton, 1853)
Stigmella centifoliella (Zeller, 1848)
Stigmella crataegella (Klimesch, 1936)
Stigmella desperatella (Frey, 1856)
Stigmella dorsiguttella (Johansson, 1971)
Stigmella eberhardi (Johansson, 1971)
Stigmella fasciata van Nieukerken & Johansson, 2003
Stigmella floslactella (Haworth, 1828)
Stigmella freyella (Heyden, 1858)
Stigmella glutinosae (Stainton, 1858)
Stigmella hemargyrella (Kollar, 1832)
Stigmella hybnerella (Hübner, 1796)
Stigmella incognitella (Herrich-Schäffer, 1855)
Stigmella johanssonella A. & Z. Lastuvka, 1997
Stigmella lapponica (Wocke, 1862)
Stigmella lemniscella (Zeller, 1839)
Stigmella lonicerarum (Frey, 1856)
Stigmella luteella (Stainton, 1857)
Stigmella magdalenae (Klimesch, 1950)
Stigmella malella (Stainton, 1854)
Stigmella mespilicola (Frey, 1856)
Stigmella microtheriella (Stainton, 1854)
Stigmella minusculella (Herrich-Schäffer, 1855)
Stigmella nivenburgensis (Preissecker, 1942)
Stigmella nylandriella (Tengstrom, 1848)
Stigmella obliquella (Heinemann, 1862)
Stigmella oxyacanthella (Stainton, 1854)
Stigmella paliurella Gerasimov, 1937
Stigmella pallidiciliella Klimesch, 1946
Stigmella paradoxa (Frey, 1858)
Stigmella perpygmaeella (Doubleday, 1859)
Stigmella plagicolella (Stainton, 1854)
Stigmella poterii (Stainton, 1857)
Stigmella prunetorum (Stainton, 1855)
Stigmella pyri (Glitz, 1865)
Stigmella regiella (Herrich-Schäffer, 1855)
Stigmella rhamnella (Herrich-Schäffer, 1860)
Stigmella roborella (Johansson, 1971)
Stigmella rolandi van Nieukerken, 1990
Stigmella ruficapitella (Haworth, 1828)
Stigmella sakhalinella Puplesis, 1984
Stigmella salicis (Stainton, 1854)
Stigmella samiatella (Zeller, 1839)
Stigmella sorbi (Stainton, 1861)
Stigmella speciosa (Frey, 1858)
Stigmella splendidissimella (Herrich-Schäffer, 1855)
Stigmella suberivora (Stainton, 1869)
Stigmella thuringiaca (Petry, 1904)
Stigmella tiliae (Frey, 1856)
Stigmella tityrella (Stainton, 1854)
Stigmella trimaculella (Haworth, 1828)
Stigmella ulmivora (Fologne, 1860)
Stigmella vimineticola (Frey, 1856)
Stigmella viscerella (Stainton, 1853)
Stigmella zangherii (Klimesch, 1951)
Trifurcula liskai A. & Z. Lastuvka, 2000
Trifurcula cryptella (Stainton, 1856)
Trifurcula eurema (Tutt, 1899)
Trifurcula josefklimeschi van Nieukerken, 1990
Trifurcula pallidella (Duponchel, 1843)
Trifurcula subnitidella (Duponchel, 1843)

Noctuidae
Abrostola agnorista Dufay, 1956
Abrostola asclepiadis (Denis & Schiffermüller, 1775)
Abrostola tripartita (Hufnagel, 1766)
Abrostola triplasia (Linnaeus, 1758)
Acontia lucida (Hufnagel, 1766)
Acontia trabealis (Scopoli, 1763)
Acontia melanura (Tauscher, 1809)
Acontiola moldavicola (Herrich-Schäffer, 1851)
Acosmetia caliginosa (Hübner, 1813)
Acronicta aceris (Linnaeus, 1758)
Acronicta leporina (Linnaeus, 1758)
Acronicta strigosa (Denis & Schiffermüller, 1775)
Acronicta alni (Linnaeus, 1767)
Acronicta cuspis (Hübner, 1813)
Acronicta psi (Linnaeus, 1758)
Acronicta tridens (Denis & Schiffermüller, 1775)
Acronicta auricoma (Denis & Schiffermüller, 1775)
Acronicta euphorbiae (Denis & Schiffermüller, 1775)
Acronicta orientalis (Mann, 1862)
Acronicta rumicis (Linnaeus, 1758)
Actebia praecox (Linnaeus, 1758)
Actebia fugax (Treitschke, 1825)
Actinotia polyodon (Clerck, 1759)
Actinotia radiosa (Esper, 1804)
Aedia funesta (Esper, 1786)
Aedia leucomelas (Linnaeus, 1758)
Aegle kaekeritziana (Hübner, 1799)
Aegle semicana (Esper, 1798)
Agrochola lychnidis (Denis & Schiffermüller, 1775)
Agrochola lactiflora Draudt, 1934
Agrochola helvola (Linnaeus, 1758)
Agrochola humilis (Denis & Schiffermüller, 1775)
Agrochola kindermannii (Fischer v. Röslerstamm, 1837)
Agrochola litura (Linnaeus, 1758)
Agrochola nitida (Denis & Schiffermüller, 1775)
Agrochola thurneri Boursin, 1953
Agrochola lota (Clerck, 1759)
Agrochola macilenta (Hübner, 1809)
Agrochola laevis (Hübner, 1803)
Agrotis bigramma (Esper, 1790)
Agrotis cinerea (Denis & Schiffermüller, 1775)
Agrotis clavis (Hufnagel, 1766)
Agrotis exclamationis (Linnaeus, 1758)
Agrotis ipsilon (Hufnagel, 1766)
Agrotis segetum (Denis & Schiffermüller, 1775)
Agrotis spinifera (Hübner, 1808)
Agrotis trux (Hübner, 1824)
Allophyes oxyacanthae (Linnaeus, 1758)
Amephana dalmatica (Rebel, 1919)
Ammoconia caecimacula (Denis & Schiffermüller, 1775)
Ammoconia senex (Geyer, 1828)
Amphipoea fucosa (Freyer, 1830)
Amphipoea oculea (Linnaeus, 1761)
Amphipyra berbera Rungs, 1949
Amphipyra effusa Boisduval, 1828
Amphipyra livida (Denis & Schiffermüller, 1775)
Amphipyra micans Lederer, 1857
Amphipyra perflua (Fabricius, 1787)
Amphipyra pyramidea (Linnaeus, 1758)
Amphipyra stix Herrich-Schäffer, 1850
Amphipyra tetra (Fabricius, 1787)
Amphipyra tragopoginis (Clerck, 1759)
Amphipyra cinnamomea (Goeze, 1781)
Anaplectoides prasina (Denis & Schiffermüller, 1775)
Anarta myrtilli (Linnaeus, 1761)
Anarta dianthi (Tauscher, 1809)
Anarta odontites (Boisduval, 1829)
Anarta trifolii (Hufnagel, 1766)
Anorthoa munda (Denis & Schiffermüller, 1775)
Anthracia eriopoda (Herrich-Schäffer, 1851)
Antitype chi (Linnaeus, 1758)
Antitype jonis (Lederer, 1865)
Antitype suda (Geyer, 1832)
Apamea anceps (Denis & Schiffermüller, 1775)
Apamea aquila Donzel, 1837
Apamea crenata (Hufnagel, 1766)
Apamea epomidion (Haworth, 1809)
Apamea furva (Denis & Schiffermüller, 1775)
Apamea illyria Freyer, 1846
Apamea lateritia (Hufnagel, 1766)
Apamea lithoxylaea (Denis & Schiffermüller, 1775)
Apamea maillardi (Geyer, 1834)
Apamea monoglypha (Hufnagel, 1766)
Apamea oblonga (Haworth, 1809)
Apamea platinea (Treitschke, 1825)
Apamea remissa (Hübner, 1809)
Apamea rubrirena (Treitschke, 1825)
Apamea scolopacina (Esper, 1788)
Apamea sordens (Hufnagel, 1766)
Apamea sublustris (Esper, 1788)
Apamea unanimis (Hübner, 1813)
Apamea zeta (Treitschke, 1825)
Apaustis rupicola (Denis & Schiffermüller, 1775)
Aporophyla australis (Boisduval, 1829)
Aporophyla canescens (Duponchel, 1826)
Aporophyla lutulenta (Denis & Schiffermüller, 1775)
Aporophyla nigra (Haworth, 1809)
Apterogenum ypsillon (Denis & Schiffermüller, 1775)
Archanara neurica (Hübner, 1808)
Asteroscopus sphinx (Hufnagel, 1766)
Asteroscopus syriaca (Warren, 1910)
Atethmia ambusta (Denis & Schiffermüller, 1775)
Atethmia centrago (Haworth, 1809)
Athetis furvula (Hübner, 1808)
Athetis gluteosa (Treitschke, 1835)
Athetis pallustris (Hübner, 1808)
Athetis lepigone (Moschler, 1860)
Atypha pulmonaris (Esper, 1790)
Auchmis detersa (Esper, 1787)
Autographa gamma (Linnaeus, 1758)
Autographa jota (Linnaeus, 1758)
Autographa pulchrina (Haworth, 1809)
Axylia putris (Linnaeus, 1761)
Behounekia freyeri (Frivaldszky, 1835)
Brachionycha nubeculosa (Esper, 1785)
Brachylomia viminalis (Fabricius, 1776)
Bryophila ereptricula Treitschke, 1825
Bryophila orthogramma (Boursin, 1954)
Bryophila raptricula (Denis & Schiffermüller, 1775)
Bryophila ravula (Hübner, 1813)
Bryophila rectilinea (Warren, 1909)
Bryophila seladona Christoph, 1885
Bryophila tephrocharis (Boursin, 1953)
Bryophila domestica (Hufnagel, 1766)
Calamia tridens (Hufnagel, 1766)
Calliergis ramosa (Esper, 1786)
Callopistria juventina (Stoll, 1782)
Callopistria latreillei (Duponchel, 1827)
Calophasia lunula (Hufnagel, 1766)
Calophasia opalina (Esper, 1793)
Calophasia platyptera (Esper, 1788)
Caradrina morpheus (Hufnagel, 1766)
Caradrina gilva (Donzel, 1837)
Caradrina clavipalpis Scopoli, 1763
Caradrina flavirena Guenee, 1852
Caradrina selini Boisduval, 1840
Caradrina suscianja (Mentzer, 1981)
Caradrina wullschlegeli Pungeler, 1903
Caradrina aspersa Rambur, 1834
Caradrina kadenii Freyer, 1836
Caradrina terrea Freyer, 1840
Ceramica pisi (Linnaeus, 1758)
Cerapteryx graminis (Linnaeus, 1758)
Cerastis leucographa (Denis & Schiffermüller, 1775)
Cerastis rubricosa (Denis & Schiffermüller, 1775)
Charanyca trigrammica (Hufnagel, 1766)
Charanyca apfelbecki (Rebel, 1901)
Charanyca ferruginea (Esper, 1785)
Chersotis cuprea (Denis & Schiffermüller, 1775)
Chersotis margaritacea (Villers, 1789)
Chersotis multangula (Hübner, 1803)
Chersotis rectangula (Denis & Schiffermüller, 1775)
Chilodes maritima (Tauscher, 1806)
Chloantha hyperici (Denis & Schiffermüller, 1775)
Chrysodeixis chalcites (Esper, 1789)
Cleoceris scoriacea (Esper, 1789)
Cleonymia opposita (Lederer, 1870)
Colocasia coryli (Linnaeus, 1758)
Condica viscosa (Freyer, 1831)
Conisania leineri (Freyer, 1836)
Conisania luteago (Denis & Schiffermüller, 1775)
Conistra ligula (Esper, 1791)
Conistra rubiginosa (Scopoli, 1763)
Conistra vaccinii (Linnaeus, 1761)
Conistra veronicae (Hübner, 1813)
Conistra erythrocephala (Denis & Schiffermüller, 1775)
Conistra rubiginea (Denis & Schiffermüller, 1775)
Conistra ragusae (Failla-Tedaldi, 1890)
Conistra torrida (Lederer, 1857)
Cosmia trapezina (Linnaeus, 1758)
Cosmia pyralina (Denis & Schiffermüller, 1775)
Cosmia confinis Herrich-Schäffer, 1849
Cosmia affinis (Linnaeus, 1767)
Craniophora ligustri (Denis & Schiffermüller, 1775)
Craniophora pontica (Staudinger, 1878)
Cryphia fraudatricula (Hübner, 1803)
Cryphia receptricula (Hübner, 1803)
Cryphia algae (Fabricius, 1775)
Cryphia ochsi (Boursin, 1940)
Crypsedra gemmea (Treitschke, 1825)
Cucullia celsiae Herrich-Schäffer, 1850
Cucullia absinthii (Linnaeus, 1761)
Cucullia argentea (Hufnagel, 1766)
Cucullia artemisiae (Hufnagel, 1766)
Cucullia asteris (Denis & Schiffermüller, 1775)
Cucullia balsamitae Boisduval, 1840
Cucullia campanulae Freyer, 1831
Cucullia chamomillae (Denis & Schiffermüller, 1775)
Cucullia formosa Rogenhofer, 1860
Cucullia fraudatrix Eversmann, 1837
Cucullia lactucae (Denis & Schiffermüller, 1775)
Cucullia lucifuga (Denis & Schiffermüller, 1775)
Cucullia santonici (Hübner, 1813)
Cucullia scopariae Dorfmeister, 1853
Cucullia tanaceti (Denis & Schiffermüller, 1775)
Cucullia umbratica (Linnaeus, 1758)
Cucullia xeranthemi Boisduval, 1840
Cucullia blattariae (Esper, 1790)
Cucullia gozmanyi (G. Ronkay & L. Ronkay, 1994)
Cucullia lanceolata (Villers, 1789)
Cucullia lychnitis Rambur, 1833
Cucullia prenanthis Boisduval, 1840
Cucullia scrophulariae (Denis & Schiffermüller, 1775)
Cucullia verbasci (Linnaeus, 1758)
Dasypolia ferdinandi Ruhl, 1892
Dasypolia templi (Thunberg, 1792)
Deltote bankiana (Fabricius, 1775)
Deltote deceptoria (Scopoli, 1763)
Deltote uncula (Clerck, 1759)
Deltote pygarga (Hufnagel, 1766)
Denticucullus pygmina (Haworth, 1809)
Diachrysia chrysitis (Linnaeus, 1758)
Diachrysia chryson (Esper, 1789)
Diachrysia nadeja (Oberthür, 1880)
Diachrysia zosimi (Hübner, 1822)
Diarsia mendica (Fabricius, 1775)
Diarsia rubi (Vieweg, 1790)
Dichagyris flammatra (Denis & Schiffermüller, 1775)
Dichagyris musiva (Hübner, 1803)
Dichagyris candelisequa (Denis & Schiffermüller, 1775)
Dichagyris forcipula (Denis & Schiffermüller, 1775)
Dichagyris signifera (Denis & Schiffermüller, 1775)
Dichonia aeruginea (Hübner, 1808)
Dichonia convergens (Denis & Schiffermüller, 1775)
Dicycla oo (Linnaeus, 1758)
Diloba caeruleocephala (Linnaeus, 1758)
Dioszeghyana schmidti (Dioszeghy, 1935)
Divaena haywardi (Tams, 1926)
Dryobota labecula (Esper, 1788)
Dryobotodes tenebrosa (Esper, 1789)
Dryobotodes carbonis Wagner, 1931
Dryobotodes eremita (Fabricius, 1775)
Dryobotodes monochroma (Esper, 1790)
Dypterygia scabriuscula (Linnaeus, 1758)
Egira conspicillaris (Linnaeus, 1758)
Elaphria venustula (Hübner, 1790)
Enargia abluta (Hübner, 1808)
Enterpia laudeti (Boisduval, 1840)
Epilecta linogrisea (Denis & Schiffermüller, 1775)
Epimecia ustula (Freyer, 1835)
Epipsilia latens (Hübner, 1809)
Episema glaucina (Esper, 1789)
Episema korsakovi (Christoph, 1885)
Episema lederi Christoph, 1885
Episema tersa (Denis & Schiffermüller, 1775)
Eremobia ochroleuca (Denis & Schiffermüller, 1775)
Eucarta amethystina (Hübner, 1803)
Eucarta virgo (Treitschke, 1835)
Euchalcia consona (Fabricius, 1787)
Euchalcia modestoides Poole, 1989
Eugnorisma depuncta (Linnaeus, 1761)
Eugraphe sigma (Denis & Schiffermüller, 1775)
Euplexia lucipara (Linnaeus, 1758)
Eupsilia transversa (Hufnagel, 1766)
Euxoa aquilina (Denis & Schiffermüller, 1775)
Euxoa birivia (Denis & Schiffermüller, 1775)
Euxoa cos (Hübner, 1824)
Euxoa decora (Denis & Schiffermüller, 1775)
Euxoa glabella Wagner, 1930
Euxoa nigricans (Linnaeus, 1761)
Euxoa nigrofusca (Esper, 1788)
Euxoa obelisca (Denis & Schiffermüller, 1775)
Euxoa recussa (Hübner, 1817)
Euxoa temera (Hübner, 1808)
Euxoa tritici (Linnaeus, 1761)
Evisa schawerdae Reisser, 1930
Globia algae (Esper, 1789)
Gortyna borelii Pierret, 1837
Gortyna flavago (Denis & Schiffermüller, 1775)
Gortyna puengeleri (Turati, 1909)
Graphiphora augur (Fabricius, 1775)
Griposia aprilina (Linnaeus, 1758)
Hada plebeja (Linnaeus, 1761)
Hadena irregularis (Hufnagel, 1766)
Hadena perplexa (Denis & Schiffermüller, 1775)
Hadena silenes (Hübner, 1822)
Hadena adriana (Schawerda, 1921)
Hadena albimacula (Borkhausen, 1792)
Hadena bicruris (Hufnagel, 1766)
Hadena caesia (Denis & Schiffermüller, 1775)
Hadena clara (Staudinger, 1901)
Hadena compta (Denis & Schiffermüller, 1775)
Hadena confusa (Hufnagel, 1766)
Hadena filograna (Esper, 1788)
Hadena gueneei (Staudinger, 1901)
Hadena luteocincta (Rambur, 1834)
Hadena magnolii (Boisduval, 1829)
Hadena vulcanica (Turati, 1907)
Haemerosia renalis (Hübner, 1813)
Hecatera bicolorata (Hufnagel, 1766)
Hecatera cappa (Hübner, 1809)
Hecatera dysodea (Denis & Schiffermüller, 1775)
Helicoverpa armigera (Hübner, 1808)
Heliothis incarnata Freyer, 1838
Heliothis maritima Graslin, 1855
Heliothis nubigera Herrich-Schäffer, 1851
Heliothis ononis (Denis & Schiffermüller, 1775)
Heliothis peltigera (Denis & Schiffermüller, 1775)
Heliothis viriplaca (Hufnagel, 1766)
Helivictoria victorina (Sodoffsky, 1849)
Hoplodrina ambigua (Denis & Schiffermüller, 1775)
Hoplodrina blanda (Denis & Schiffermüller, 1775)
Hoplodrina octogenaria (Goeze, 1781)
Hoplodrina respersa (Denis & Schiffermüller, 1775)
Hoplodrina superstes (Ochsenheimer, 1816)
Hydraecia micacea (Esper, 1789)
Hydraecia petasitis Doubleday, 1847
Hyppa rectilinea (Esper, 1788)
Ipimorpha retusa (Linnaeus, 1761)
Ipimorpha subtusa (Denis & Schiffermüller, 1775)
Janthinea friwaldskii (Duponchel, 1835)
Jodia croceago (Denis & Schiffermüller, 1775)
Lacanobia contigua (Denis & Schiffermüller, 1775)
Lacanobia suasa (Denis & Schiffermüller, 1775)
Lacanobia thalassina (Hufnagel, 1766)
Lacanobia aliena (Hübner, 1809)
Lacanobia blenna (Hübner, 1824)
Lacanobia oleracea (Linnaeus, 1758)
Lacanobia splendens (Hübner, 1808)
Lacanobia w-latinum (Hufnagel, 1766)
Lamprotes c-aureum (Knoch, 1781)
Lasionycta proxima (Hübner, 1809)
Lateroligia ophiogramma (Esper, 1794)
Lenisa geminipuncta (Haworth, 1809)
Leucania loreyi (Duponchel, 1827)
Leucania comma (Linnaeus, 1761)
Leucania obsoleta (Hübner, 1803)
Leucania punctosa (Treitschke, 1825)
Leucania putrescens (Hübner, 1824)
Leucania zeae (Duponchel, 1827)
Lithophane furcifera (Hufnagel, 1766)
Lithophane ledereri (Staudinger, 1892)
Lithophane merckii (Rambur, 1832)
Lithophane ornitopus (Hufnagel, 1766)
Lithophane semibrunnea (Haworth, 1809)
Lithophane socia (Hufnagel, 1766)
Lithophane lapidea (Hübner, 1808)
Litoligia literosa (Haworth, 1809)
Luperina dumerilii (Duponchel, 1826)
Luperina nickerlii (Freyer, 1845)
Luperina rubella (Duponchel, 1835)
Luperina testacea (Denis & Schiffermüller, 1775)
Lycophotia erythrina (Herrich-Schäffer, 1852)
Lycophotia porphyrea (Denis & Schiffermüller, 1775)
Macdunnoughia confusa (Stephens, 1850)
Mamestra brassicae (Linnaeus, 1758)
Maraschia grisescens Osthelder, 1933
Meganephria bimaculosa (Linnaeus, 1767)
Mesapamea secalella Remm, 1983
Mesapamea secalis (Linnaeus, 1758)
Mesogona acetosellae (Denis & Schiffermüller, 1775)
Mesoligia furuncula (Denis & Schiffermüller, 1775)
Mesotrosta signalis (Treitschke, 1829)
Mniotype adusta (Esper, 1790)
Mniotype satura (Denis & Schiffermüller, 1775)
Mniotype solieri (Boisduval, 1829)
Moma alpium (Osbeck, 1778)
Mormo maura (Linnaeus, 1758)
Mythimna riparia (Rambur, 1829)
Mythimna albipuncta (Denis & Schiffermüller, 1775)
Mythimna congrua (Hübner, 1817)
Mythimna ferrago (Fabricius, 1787)
Mythimna l-album (Linnaeus, 1767)
Mythimna conigera (Denis & Schiffermüller, 1775)
Mythimna impura (Hübner, 1808)
Mythimna pallens (Linnaeus, 1758)
Mythimna pudorina (Denis & Schiffermüller, 1775)
Mythimna straminea (Treitschke, 1825)
Mythimna turca (Linnaeus, 1761)
Mythimna vitellina (Hübner, 1808)
Mythimna alopecuri (Boisduval, 1840)
Mythimna sicula (Treitschke, 1835)
Naenia typica (Linnaeus, 1758)
Noctua comes Hübner, 1813
Noctua fimbriata (Schreber, 1759)
Noctua interjecta Hübner, 1803
Noctua interposita (Hübner, 1790)
Noctua janthe (Borkhausen, 1792)
Noctua janthina Denis & Schiffermüller, 1775
Noctua orbona (Hufnagel, 1766)
Noctua pronuba (Linnaeus, 1758)
Noctua tertia Mentzer & al., 1991
Noctua tirrenica Biebinger, Speidel & Hanigk, 1983
Nyctobrya amasina Draudt, 1931
Nyctobrya muralis (Forster, 1771)
Ochropleura leucogaster (Freyer, 1831)
Ochropleura plecta (Linnaeus, 1761)
Oligia fasciuncula (Haworth, 1809)
Oligia latruncula (Denis & Schiffermüller, 1775)
Oligia strigilis (Linnaeus, 1758)
Oligia versicolor (Borkhausen, 1792)
Olivenebula subsericata (Herrich-Schäffer, 1861)
Omia cymbalariae (Hübner, 1809)
Omphalophana anatolica (Lederer, 1857)
Omphalophana antirrhinii (Hübner, 1803)
Opigena polygona (Denis & Schiffermüller, 1775)
Oria musculosa (Hübner, 1808)
Orthosia gracilis (Denis & Schiffermüller, 1775)
Orthosia opima (Hübner, 1809)
Orthosia cerasi (Fabricius, 1775)
Orthosia cruda (Denis & Schiffermüller, 1775)
Orthosia dalmatica (Wagner, 1909)
Orthosia miniosa (Denis & Schiffermüller, 1775)
Orthosia populeti (Fabricius, 1775)
Orthosia incerta (Hufnagel, 1766)
Orthosia gothica (Linnaeus, 1758)
Oxicesta chamoenices (Herrich-Schäffer, 1845)
Oxicesta geographica (Fabricius, 1787)
Oxytripia orbiculosa (Esper, 1799)
Pachetra sagittigera (Hufnagel, 1766)
Panchrysia aurea (Hübner, 1803)
Panchrysia v-argenteum (Esper, 1798)
Panemeria tenebrata (Scopoli, 1763)
Panolis flammea (Denis & Schiffermüller, 1775)
Panthea coenobita (Esper, 1785)
Papestra biren (Goeze, 1781)
Parastichtis suspecta (Hübner, 1817)
Peridroma saucia (Hübner, 1808)
Perigrapha i-cinctum (Denis & Schiffermüller, 1775)
Perigrapha rorida Frivaldszky, 1835
Periphanes delphinii (Linnaeus, 1758)
Philareta treitschkei (Frivaldszky, 1835)
Phlogophora meticulosa (Linnaeus, 1758)
Phlogophora scita (Hübner, 1790)
Photedes captiuncula (Treitschke, 1825)
Photedes extrema (Hübner, 1809)
Photedes minima (Haworth, 1809)
Photedes morrisii (Dale, 1837)
Phyllophila obliterata (Rambur, 1833)
Plusidia cheiranthi (Tauscher, 1809)
Polia bombycina (Hufnagel, 1766)
Polia nebulosa (Hufnagel, 1766)
Polia serratilinea Ochsenheimer, 1816
Polychrysia moneta (Fabricius, 1787)
Polymixis culoti (Schawerda, 1921)
Polymixis leuconota (Frivaldszky, 1841)
Polymixis flavicincta (Denis & Schiffermüller, 1775)
Polymixis polymita (Linnaeus, 1761)
Polymixis rufocincta (Geyer, 1828)
Polymixis serpentina (Treitschke, 1825)
Polyphaenis sericata (Esper, 1787)
Praestilbia armeniaca Staudinger, 1892
Protoschinia scutosa (Denis & Schiffermüller, 1775)
Pseudeustrotia candidula (Denis & Schiffermüller, 1775)
Pseudluperina pozzii (Curo, 1883)
Pyrrhia purpura (Hübner, 1817)
Pyrrhia umbra (Hufnagel, 1766)
Rhizedra lutosa (Hübner, 1803)
Rhyacia lucipeta (Denis & Schiffermüller, 1775)
Rhyacia simulans (Hufnagel, 1766)
Rileyiana fovea (Treitschke, 1825)
Saragossa porosa (Eversmann, 1854)
Schinia cardui (Hübner, 1790)
Schinia cognata (Freyer, 1833)
Scotochrosta pulla (Denis & Schiffermüller, 1775)
Sesamia cretica Lederer, 1857
Sesamia nonagrioides Lefebvre, 1827
Sideridis rivularis (Fabricius, 1775)
Sideridis implexa (Hübner, 1809)
Sideridis kitti (Schawerda, 1914)
Sideridis reticulata (Goeze, 1781)
Sideridis lampra (Schawerda, 1913)
Sideridis turbida (Esper, 1790)
Simyra albovenosa (Goeze, 1781)
Simyra dentinosa Freyer, 1838
Simyra nervosa (Denis & Schiffermüller, 1775)
Spaelotis ravida (Denis & Schiffermüller, 1775)
Spaelotis senna (Freyer, 1829)
Spodoptera exigua (Hübner, 1808)
Stenoecia dos (Freyer, 1838)
Subacronicta megacephala (Denis & Schiffermüller, 1775)
Syngrapha devergens (Hübner, 1813)
Synthymia fixa (Fabricius, 1787)
Teinoptera lunaki (Boursin, 1940)
Teinoptera olivina (Herrich-Schäffer, 1852)
Thalpophila matura (Hufnagel, 1766)
Tholera cespitis (Denis & Schiffermüller, 1775)
Tholera decimalis (Poda, 1761)
Thysanoplusia orichalcea (Fabricius, 1775)
Tiliacea aurago (Denis & Schiffermüller, 1775)
Tiliacea citrago (Linnaeus, 1758)
Tiliacea cypreago (Hampson, 1906)
Tiliacea sulphurago (Denis & Schiffermüller, 1775)
Trachea atriplicis (Linnaeus, 1758)
Trichoplusia ni (Hübner, 1803)
Trichosea ludifica (Linnaeus, 1758)
Trigonophora flammea (Esper, 1785)
Tyta luctuosa (Denis & Schiffermüller, 1775)
Ulochlaena hirta (Hübner, 1813)
Valeria jaspidea (Villers, 1789)
Valeria oleagina (Denis & Schiffermüller, 1775)
Xanthia gilvago (Denis & Schiffermüller, 1775)
Xanthia icteritia (Hufnagel, 1766)
Xanthia ocellaris (Borkhausen, 1792)
Xanthia ruticilla (Esper, 1791)
Xanthia togata (Esper, 1788)
Xestia ashworthii (Doubleday, 1855)
Xestia c-nigrum (Linnaeus, 1758)
Xestia ditrapezium (Denis & Schiffermüller, 1775)
Xestia viridescens (Turati, 1919)
Xestia baja (Denis & Schiffermüller, 1775)
Xestia castanea (Esper, 1798)
Xestia stigmatica (Hübner, 1813)
Xestia xanthographa (Denis & Schiffermüller, 1775)
Xylena exsoleta (Linnaeus, 1758)
Xylena lunifera Warren, 1910
Xylena vetusta (Hübner, 1813)

Nolidae
Bena bicolorana (Fuessly, 1775)
Earias clorana (Linnaeus, 1761)
Earias vernana (Fabricius, 1787)
Meganola albula (Denis & Schiffermüller, 1775)
Meganola strigula (Denis & Schiffermüller, 1775)
Meganola togatulalis (Hübner, 1796)
Nola confusalis (Herrich-Schäffer, 1847)
Nola cucullatella (Linnaeus, 1758)
Nola subchlamydula Staudinger, 1871
Nycteola asiatica (Krulikovsky, 1904)
Nycteola columbana (Turner, 1925)
Nycteola revayana (Scopoli, 1772)
Nycteola siculana (Fuchs, 1899)
Pseudoips prasinana (Linnaeus, 1758)

Notodontidae
Cerura vinula (Linnaeus, 1758)
Clostera anachoreta (Denis & Schiffermüller, 1775)
Clostera anastomosis (Linnaeus, 1758)
Clostera curtula (Linnaeus, 1758)
Clostera pigra (Hufnagel, 1766)
Dicranura ulmi (Denis & Schiffermüller, 1775)
Drymonia dodonaea (Denis & Schiffermüller, 1775)
Drymonia querna (Denis & Schiffermüller, 1775)
Drymonia ruficornis (Hufnagel, 1766)
Furcula bifida (Brahm, 1787)
Furcula furcula (Clerck, 1759)
Harpyia milhauseri (Fabricius, 1775)
Notodonta dromedarius (Linnaeus, 1767)
Notodonta tritophus (Denis & Schiffermüller, 1775)
Notodonta ziczac (Linnaeus, 1758)
Paradrymonia vittata (Staudinger, 1892)
Peridea anceps (Goeze, 1781)
Phalera bucephala (Linnaeus, 1758)
Phalera bucephaloides (Ochsenheimer, 1810)
Pheosia gnoma (Fabricius, 1776)
Pheosia tremula (Clerck, 1759)
Pterostoma palpina (Clerck, 1759)
Ptilodon capucina (Linnaeus, 1758)
Ptilodon cucullina (Denis & Schiffermüller, 1775)
Spatalia argentina (Denis & Schiffermüller, 1775)
Stauropus fagi (Linnaeus, 1758)
Thaumetopoea processionea (Linnaeus, 1758)
Thaumetopoea solitaria (Freyer, 1838)

Oecophoridae
Alabonia staintoniella (Zeller, 1850)
Batia internella Jackh, 1972
Batia lambdella (Donovan, 1793)
Bisigna procerella (Denis & Schiffermüller, 1775)
Borkhausenia minutella (Linnaeus, 1758)
Crassa tinctella (Hübner, 1796)
Dasycera oliviella (Fabricius, 1794)
Decantha borkhausenii (Zeller, 1839)
Denisia similella (Hübner, 1796)
Denisia stipella (Linnaeus, 1758)
Endrosis sarcitrella (Linnaeus, 1758)
Harpella forficella (Scopoli, 1763)
Holoscolia huebneri Kocak, 1980
Kasyniana diminutella (Rebel, 1931)
Oecophora bractella (Linnaeus, 1758)
Pleurota aristella (Linnaeus, 1767)
Pleurota bicostella (Clerck, 1759)
Pleurota pungitiella Herrich-Schäffer, 1854
Pleurota pyropella (Denis & Schiffermüller, 1775)
Pleurota punctella (O. Costa, 1836)
Schiffermuelleria schaefferella (Linnaeus, 1758)

Peleopodidae
Carcina quercana (Fabricius, 1775)

Psychidae
Acanthopsyche atra (Linnaeus, 1767)
Acanthopsyche zelleri (Mann, 1855)
Anaproutia comitella (Bruand, 1853)
Anaproutia raiblensis (Mann, 1870)
Apterona crenulella (Bruand, 1853)
Bijugis bombycella (Denis & Schiffermüller, 1775)
Bijugis pectinella (Denis & Schiffermüller, 1775)
Brevantennia triglavensis (Rebel, 1919)
Canephora hirsuta (Poda, 1761)
Dahlica lichenella (Linnaeus, 1761)
Dahlica triquetrella (Hübner, 1813)
Epichnopterix ardua (Mann, 1867)
Epichnopterix kovacsi Sieder, 1955
Leptopterix plumistrella (Hübner, 1793)
Pachythelia villosella (Ochsenheimer, 1810)
Phalacropterix praecellens (Staudinger, 1870)
Postsolenobia juliella (Rebel, 1919)
Postsolenobia nanosella Petru & Liska, 2003
Proutia betulina (Zeller, 1839)
Psyche casta (Pallas, 1767)
Psyche crassiorella Bruand, 1851
Ptilocephala plumifera (Ochsenheimer, 1810)
Rebelia herrichiella Strand, 1912
Rebelia sapho (Milliere, 1864)
Rebelia styriaca Rebel, 1937
Rebelia surientella (Bruand, 1858)
Siederia alpicolella (Rebel, 1919)
Siederia meierella (Sieder, 1956)
Sterrhopterix fusca (Haworth, 1809)
Sterrhopterix standfussi (Wocke, 1851)
Taleporia tubulosa (Retzius, 1783)
Typhonia ciliaris (Ochsenheimer, 1810)

Pterophoridae
Adaina microdactyla (Hübner, 1813)
Amblyptilia acanthadactyla (Hübner, 1813)
Amblyptilia punctidactyla (Haworth, 1811)
Crombrugghia distans (Zeller, 1847)
Emmelina monodactyla (Linnaeus, 1758)
Gypsochares baptodactylus (Zeller, 1850)
Hellinsia carphodactyla (Hübner, 1813)
Hellinsia osteodactylus (Zeller, 1841)
Hellinsia tephradactyla (Hübner, 1813)
Merrifieldia leucodactyla (Denis & Schiffermüller, 1775)
Merrifieldia malacodactylus (Zeller, 1847)
Oidaematophorus constanti Ragonot, 1875
Oxyptilus chrysodactyla (Denis & Schiffermüller, 1775)
Oxyptilus parvidactyla (Haworth, 1811)
Oxyptilus pilosellae (Zeller, 1841)
Platyptilia calodactyla (Denis & Schiffermüller, 1775)
Platyptilia farfarellus Zeller, 1867
Platyptilia gonodactyla (Denis & Schiffermüller, 1775)
Platyptilia nemoralis Zeller, 1841
Platyptilia tesseradactyla (Linnaeus, 1761)
Pterophorus pentadactyla (Linnaeus, 1758)
Stenoptilia bipunctidactyla (Scopoli, 1763)
Stenoptilia stigmatodactylus (Zeller, 1852)
Stenoptilia zophodactylus (Duponchel, 1840)

Pyralidae
Aglossa pinguinalis (Linnaeus, 1758)
Aphomia sociella (Linnaeus, 1758)
Assara terebrella (Zincken, 1818)
Catastia marginea (Denis & Schiffermüller, 1775)
Delplanqueia dilutella (Denis & Schiffermüller, 1775)
Dioryctria abietella (Denis & Schiffermüller, 1775)
Endotricha flammealis (Denis & Schiffermüller, 1775)
Ephestia elutella (Hübner, 1796)
Eurhodope rosella (Scopoli, 1763)
Euzopherodes lutisignella (Mann, 1869)
Matilella fusca (Haworth, 1811)
Moitrelia obductella (Zeller, 1839)
Oncocera semirubella (Scopoli, 1763)
Pempeliella ornatella (Denis & Schiffermüller, 1775)
Phycitodes binaevella (Hübner, 1813)
Pyralis farinalis (Linnaeus, 1758)
Sciota adelphella (Fischer v. Röslerstamm, 1836)
Selagia argyrella (Denis & Schiffermüller, 1775)
Stemmatophora brunnealis (Treitschke, 1829)
Synaphe punctalis (Fabricius, 1775)

Saturniidae
Aglia tau (Linnaeus, 1758)
Antheraea yamamai (Guerin-Meneville, 1861)
Samia cynthia (Drury, 1773)
Saturnia pavoniella (Scopoli, 1763)
Saturnia caecigena Kupido, 1825
Saturnia pyri (Denis & Schiffermüller, 1775)

Scythrididae
Enolmis desidella (Lederer, 1855)
Scythris albidella (Stainton, 1867)
Scythris albostriata Hannemann, 1961
Scythris crassiuscula (Herrich-Schäffer, 1855)
Scythris crypta Hannemann, 1961
Scythris dissimilella (Herrich-Schäffer, 1855)
Scythris ericetella (Heinemann, 1872)
Scythris flabella (Mann, 1861)
Scythris gravatella (Zeller, 1847)
Scythris knochella (Fabricius, 1794)
Scythris moldavicella Caradja, 1905
Scythris oelandicella Muller-Rutz, 1922
Scythris productella (Zeller, 1839)
Scythris sappadensis Bengtsson, 1992
Scythris subschleichiella Hannemann, 1961
Scythris subseliniella (Heinemann, 1876)
Scythris tergestinella (Zeller, 1855)
Scythris vittella (O. Costa, 1834)

Sesiidae
Bembecia albanensis (Rebel, 1918)
Bembecia himmighoffeni (Staudinger, 1866)
Bembecia ichneumoniformis (Denis & Schiffermüller, 1775)
Bembecia megillaeformis (Hübner, 1813)
Bembecia pavicevici Tosevski, 1989
Bembecia scopigera (Scopoli, 1763)
Bembecia uroceriformis (Treitschke, 1834)
Chamaesphecia aerifrons (Zeller, 1847)
Chamaesphecia astatiformis (Herrich-Schäffer, 1846)
Chamaesphecia doleriformis (Herrich-Schäffer, 1846)
Chamaesphecia dumonti Le Cerf, 1922
Chamaesphecia empiformis (Esper, 1783)
Chamaesphecia euceraeformis (Ochsenheimer, 1816)
Chamaesphecia hungarica (Tomala, 1901)
Chamaesphecia nigrifrons (Le Cerf, 1911)
Chamaesphecia schmidtiiformis (Freyer, 1836)
Chamaesphecia tenthrediniformis (Denis & Schiffermüller, 1775)
Paranthrene insolitus Le Cerf, 1914
Paranthrene tabaniformis (Rottemburg, 1775)
Pennisetia bohemica Kralicek & Povolny, 1974
Pennisetia hylaeiformis (Laspeyres, 1801)
Pyropteron affinis (Staudinger, 1856)
Pyropteron chrysidiformis (Esper, 1782)
Pyropteron triannuliformis (Freyer, 1843)
Sesia apiformis (Clerck, 1759)
Sesia bembeciformis (Hübner, 1806)
Sesia melanocephala Dalman, 1816
Synanthedon andrenaeformis (Laspeyres, 1801)
Synanthedon cephiformis (Ochsenheimer, 1808)
Synanthedon conopiformis (Esper, 1782)
Synanthedon culiciformis (Linnaeus, 1758)
Synanthedon flaviventris (Staudinger, 1883)
Synanthedon formicaeformis (Esper, 1783)
Synanthedon loranthi (Kralicek, 1966)
Synanthedon melliniformis (Laspeyres, 1801)
Synanthedon myopaeformis (Borkhausen, 1789)
Synanthedon scoliaeformis (Borkhausen, 1789)
Synanthedon soffneri Spatenka, 1983
Synanthedon spheciformis (Denis & Schiffermüller, 1775)
Synanthedon spuleri (Fuchs, 1908)
Synanthedon stomoxiformis (Hübner, 1790)
Synanthedon tipuliformis (Clerck, 1759)
Synanthedon vespiformis (Linnaeus, 1761)

Sphingidae
Acherontia atropos (Linnaeus, 1758)
Agrius convolvuli (Linnaeus, 1758)
Daphnis nerii (Linnaeus, 1758)
Deilephila elpenor (Linnaeus, 1758)
Deilephila porcellus (Linnaeus, 1758)
Hemaris croatica (Esper, 1800)
Hemaris fuciformis (Linnaeus, 1758)
Hemaris tityus (Linnaeus, 1758)
Hippotion celerio (Linnaeus, 1758)
Hyles euphorbiae (Linnaeus, 1758)
Hyles gallii (Rottemburg, 1775)
Hyles hippophaes (Esper, 1789)
Hyles livornica (Esper, 1780)
Laothoe populi (Linnaeus, 1758)
Macroglossum stellatarum (Linnaeus, 1758)
Marumba quercus (Denis & Schiffermüller, 1775)
Mimas tiliae (Linnaeus, 1758)
Proserpinus proserpina (Pallas, 1772)
Smerinthus ocellata (Linnaeus, 1758)
Sphinx ligustri Linnaeus, 1758
Sphinx pinastri Linnaeus, 1758

Thyrididae
Thyris fenestrella (Scopoli, 1763)

Tineidae
Eudarcia herculanella (Capuse, 1966)
Euplocamus anthracinalis (Scopoli, 1763)
Haplotinea insectella (Fabricius, 1794)
Infurcitinea captans Gozmany, 1960
Monopis monachella (Hübner, 1796)
Morophaga choragella (Denis & Schiffermüller, 1775)
Nemapogon clematella (Fabricius, 1781)
Nemapogon cloacella (Haworth, 1828)
Niditinea fuscella (Linnaeus, 1758)
Pelecystola fraudulentella (Zeller, 1852)
Scardia boletella (Fabricius, 1794)
Trichophaga tapetzella (Linnaeus, 1758)

Tischeriidae
Coptotriche angusticollella (Duponchel, 1843)
Coptotriche gaunacella (Duponchel, 1843)
Coptotriche heinemanni (Wocke, 1871)
Coptotriche marginea (Haworth, 1828)
Tischeria ekebladella (Bjerkander, 1795)

Tortricidae
Acleris abietana (Hübner, 1822)
Acleris aspersana (Hübner, 1817)
Acleris bergmanniana (Linnaeus, 1758)
Acleris cristana (Denis & Schiffermüller, 1775)
Acleris emargana (Fabricius, 1775)
Acleris ferrugana (Denis & Schiffermüller, 1775)
Acleris forsskaleana (Linnaeus, 1758)
Acleris hastiana (Linnaeus, 1758)
Acleris holmiana (Linnaeus, 1758)
Acleris kochiella (Goeze, 1783)
Acleris laterana (Fabricius, 1794)
Acleris literana (Linnaeus, 1758)
Acleris logiana (Clerck, 1759)
Acleris notana (Donovan, 1806)
Acleris permutana (Duponchel, 1836)
Acleris quercinana (Zeller, 1849)
Acleris rhombana (Denis & Schiffermüller, 1775)
Acleris rufana (Denis & Schiffermüller, 1775)
Acleris schalleriana (Linnaeus, 1761)
Acleris sparsana (Denis & Schiffermüller, 1775)
Acleris variegana (Denis & Schiffermüller, 1775)
Adoxophyes orana (Fischer v. Röslerstamm, 1834)
Aethes ardezana (Muller-Rutz, 1922)
Aethes aurofasciana (Mann, 1855)
Aethes cnicana (Westwood, 1854)
Aethes decimana (Denis & Schiffermüller, 1775)
Aethes deutschiana (Zetterstedt, 1839)
Aethes flagellana (Duponchel, 1836)
Aethes hartmanniana (Clerck, 1759)
Aethes margarotana (Duponchel, 1836)
Aethes rubigana (Treitschke, 1830)
Aethes rutilana (Hübner, 1817)
Aethes smeathmanniana (Fabricius, 1781)
Aethes tesserana (Denis & Schiffermüller, 1775)
Aethes williana (Brahm, 1791)
Agapeta hamana (Linnaeus, 1758)
Agapeta zoegana (Linnaeus, 1767)
Aleimma loeflingiana (Linnaeus, 1758)
Ancylis achatana (Denis & Schiffermüller, 1775)
Ancylis apicella (Denis & Schiffermüller, 1775)
Ancylis badiana (Denis & Schiffermüller, 1775)
Ancylis comptana (Frolich, 1828)
Ancylis diminutana (Haworth, 1811)
Ancylis geminana (Donovan, 1806)
Ancylis laetana (Fabricius, 1775)
Ancylis mitterbacheriana (Denis & Schiffermüller, 1775)
Ancylis myrtillana (Treitschke, 1830)
Ancylis obtusana (Haworth, 1811)
Ancylis selenana (Guenee, 1845)
Ancylis tineana (Hübner, 1799)
Ancylis uncella (Denis & Schiffermüller, 1775)
Ancylis unculana (Haworth, 1811)
Ancylis unguicella (Linnaeus, 1758)
Ancylis upupana (Treitschke, 1835)
Aphelia viburniana (Denis & Schiffermüller, 1775)
Aphelia ferugana (Hübner, 1793)
Aphelia paleana (Hübner, 1793)
Apotomis betuletana (Haworth, 1811)
Apotomis lineana (Denis & Schiffermüller, 1775)
Apotomis sauciana (Frolich, 1828)
Apotomis semifasciana (Haworth, 1811)
Apotomis sororculana (Zetterstedt, 1839)
Apotomis turbidana Hübner, 1825
Archips crataegana (Hübner, 1799)
Archips oporana (Linnaeus, 1758)
Archips podana (Scopoli, 1763)
Archips rosana (Linnaeus, 1758)
Archips xylosteana (Linnaeus, 1758)
Argyroploce arbutella (Linnaeus, 1758)
Argyroploce noricana (Herrich-Schäffer, 1851)
Argyrotaenia ljungiana (Thunberg, 1797)
Aterpia corticana (Denis & Schiffermüller, 1775)
Bactra lancealana (Hübner, 1799)
Cacoecimorpha pronubana (Hübner, 1799)
Capua vulgana (Frolich, 1828)
Celypha aurofasciana (Haworth, 1811)
Celypha cespitana (Hübner, 1817)
Celypha flavipalpana (Herrich-Schäffer, 1851)
Celypha lacunana (Denis & Schiffermüller, 1775)
Celypha rivulana (Scopoli, 1763)
Celypha rosaceana Schlager, 1847
Celypha rufana (Scopoli, 1763)
Celypha rurestrana (Duponchel, 1843)
Celypha siderana (Treitschke, 1835)
Celypha striana (Denis & Schiffermüller, 1775)
Choristoneura diversana (Hübner, 1817)
Choristoneura hebenstreitella (Muller, 1764)
Choristoneura murinana (Hübner, 1799)
Clepsis consimilana (Hübner, 1817)
Clepsis dumicolana (Zeller, 1847)
Clepsis pallidana (Fabricius, 1776)
Clepsis rolandriana (Linnaeus, 1758)
Clepsis rurinana (Linnaeus, 1758)
Clepsis senecionana (Hübner, 1819)
Clepsis spectrana (Treitschke, 1830)
Clepsis steineriana (Hübner, 1799)
Cnephasia alticolana (Herrich-Schäffer, 1851)
Cnephasia asseclana (Denis & Schiffermüller, 1775)
Cnephasia chrysantheana (Duponchel, 1843)
Cnephasia cupressivorana (Staudinger, 1871)
Cnephasia genitalana Pierce & Metcalfe, 1922
Cnephasia oxyacanthana (Herrich-Schäffer, 1851)
Cnephasia sedana (Constant, 1884)
Cnephasia stephensiana (Doubleday, 1849)
Cnephasia abrasana (Duponchel, 1843)
Cnephasia incertana (Treitschke, 1835)
Cochylidia heydeniana (Herrich-Schäffer, 1851)
Cochylidia implicitana (Wocke, 1856)
Cochylidia rupicola (Curtis, 1834)
Cochylidia subroseana (Haworth, 1811)
Cochylimorpha alternana (Stephens, 1834)
Cochylimorpha jucundana (Treitschke, 1835)
Cochylimorpha perfusana (Guenee, 1845)
Cochylimorpha straminea (Haworth, 1811)
Cochylis dubitana (Hübner, 1799)
Cochylis hybridella (Hübner, 1813)
Cochylis nana (Haworth, 1811)
Cochylis pallidana Zeller, 1847
Cochylis posterana Zeller, 1847
Cochylis roseana (Haworth, 1811)
Corticivora piniana (Herrich-Schäffer, 1851)
Crocidosema plebejana Zeller, 1847
Cydia amplana (Hübner, 1800)
Cydia conicolana (Heylaerts, 1874)
Cydia coniferana (Saxesen, 1840)
Cydia corollana (Hübner, 1823)
Cydia cosmophorana (Treitschke, 1835)
Cydia duplicana (Zetterstedt, 1839)
Cydia fagiglandana (Zeller, 1841)
Cydia illutana (Herrich-Schäffer, 1851)
Cydia inquinatana (Hübner, 1800)
Cydia leguminana (Lienig & Zeller, 1846)
Cydia microgrammana (Guenee, 1845)
Cydia nigricana (Fabricius, 1794)
Cydia pactolana (Zeller, 1840)
Cydia pomonella (Linnaeus, 1758)
Cydia pyrivora (Danilevsky, 1947)
Cydia servillana (Duponchel, 1836)
Cydia splendana (Hübner, 1799)
Cydia strobilella (Linnaeus, 1758)
Cydia succedana (Denis & Schiffermüller, 1775)
Dichelia histrionana (Frolich, 1828)
Dichrorampha acuminatana (Lienig & Zeller, 1846)
Dichrorampha aeratana (Pierce & Metcalfe, 1915)
Dichrorampha agilana (Tengstrom, 1848)
Dichrorampha alpigenana (Heinemann, 1863)
Dichrorampha alpinana (Treitschke, 1830)
Dichrorampha bugnionana (Duponchel, 1843)
Dichrorampha cacaleana (Herrich-Schäffer, 1851)
Dichrorampha consortana Stephens, 1852
Dichrorampha distinctana (Heinemann, 1863)
Dichrorampha flavidorsana Knaggs, 1867
Dichrorampha montanana (Duponchel, 1843)
Dichrorampha obscuratana (Wolff, 1955)
Dichrorampha petiverella (Linnaeus, 1758)
Dichrorampha plumbagana (Treitschke, 1830)
Dichrorampha plumbana (Scopoli, 1763)
Dichrorampha senectana Guenee, 1845
Dichrorampha sequana (Hübner, 1799)
Dichrorampha simpliciana (Haworth, 1811)
Ditula angustiorana (Haworth, 1811)
Ditula joannisiana (Ragonot, 1888)
Doloploca punctulana (Denis & Schiffermüller, 1775)
Eana penziana (Thunberg, 1791)
Eana argentana (Clerck, 1759)
Eana osseana (Scopoli, 1763)
Eana canescana (Guenee, 1845)
Enarmonia formosana (Scopoli, 1763)
Endothenia ericetana (Humphreys & Westwood, 1845)
Endothenia gentianaeana (Hübner, 1799)
Endothenia lapideana (Herrich-Schäffer, 1851)
Endothenia marginana (Haworth, 1811)
Endothenia nigricostana (Haworth, 1811)
Endothenia oblongana (Haworth, 1811)
Endothenia quadrimaculana (Haworth, 1811)
Endothenia ustulana (Haworth, 1811)
Epagoge grotiana (Fabricius, 1781)
Epiblema costipunctana (Haworth, 1811)
Epiblema foenella (Linnaeus, 1758)
Epiblema grandaevana (Lienig & Zeller, 1846)
Epiblema graphana (Treitschke, 1835)
Epiblema hepaticana (Treitschke, 1835)
Epiblema scutulana (Denis & Schiffermüller, 1775)
Epiblema similana (Denis & Schiffermüller, 1775)
Epiblema simploniana (Duponchel, 1835)
Epiblema sticticana (Fabricius, 1794)
Epiblema turbidana (Treitschke, 1835)
Epinotia abbreviana (Fabricius, 1794)
Epinotia bilunana (Haworth, 1811)
Epinotia brunnichana (Linnaeus, 1767)
Epinotia crenana (Hübner, 1799)
Epinotia cruciana (Linnaeus, 1761)
Epinotia demarniana (Fischer v. Röslerstamm, 1840)
Epinotia festivana (Hübner, 1799)
Epinotia fraternana (Haworth, 1811)
Epinotia granitana (Herrich-Schäffer, 1851)
Epinotia immundana (Fischer v. Röslerstamm, 1839)
Epinotia kochiana (Herrich-Schäffer, 1851)
Epinotia maculana (Fabricius, 1775)
Epinotia mercuriana (Frolich, 1828)
Epinotia nanana (Treitschke, 1835)
Epinotia nigricana (Herrich-Schäffer, 1851)
Epinotia nisella (Clerck, 1759)
Epinotia pusillana (Peyerimhoff, 1863)
Epinotia pygmaeana (Hübner, 1799)
Epinotia ramella (Linnaeus, 1758)
Epinotia signatana (Douglas, 1845)
Epinotia solandriana (Linnaeus, 1758)
Epinotia subocellana (Donovan, 1806)
Epinotia subsequana (Haworth, 1811)
Epinotia tedella (Clerck, 1759)
Epinotia tenerana (Denis & Schiffermüller, 1775)
Epinotia tetraquetrana (Haworth, 1811)
Epinotia thapsiana (Zeller, 1847)
Epinotia trigonella (Linnaeus, 1758)
Eriopsela klimeschi Obraztsov, 1952
Eriopsela quadrana (Hübner, 1813)
Eucosma aemulana (Schlager, 1849)
Eucosma albidulana (Herrich-Schäffer, 1851)
Eucosma aspidiscana (Hübner, 1817)
Eucosma campoliliana (Denis & Schiffermüller, 1775)
Eucosma cana (Haworth, 1811)
Eucosma conterminana (Guenee, 1845)
Eucosma fervidana (Zeller, 1847)
Eucosma hohenwartiana (Denis & Schiffermüller, 1775)
Eucosma metzneriana (Treitschke, 1830)
Eucosma obumbratana (Lienig & Zeller, 1846)
Eucosma pupillana (Clerck, 1759)
Eucosma wimmerana (Treitschke, 1835)
Eucosmomorpha albersana (Hübner, 1813)
Eudemis porphyrana (Hübner, 1799)
Eudemis profundana (Denis & Schiffermüller, 1775)
Eulia ministrana (Linnaeus, 1758)
Eupoecilia ambiguella (Hübner, 1796)
Eupoecilia angustana (Hübner, 1799)
Exapate congelatella (Clerck, 1759)
Falseuncaria ruficiliana (Haworth, 1811)
Fulvoclysia nerminae Kocak, 1982
Grapholita funebrana Treitschke, 1835
Grapholita janthinana (Duponchel, 1843)
Grapholita lobarzewskii (Nowicki, 1860)
Grapholita tenebrosana Duponchel, 1843
Grapholita caecana Schlager, 1847
Grapholita compositella (Fabricius, 1775)
Grapholita coronillana Lienig & Zeller, 1846
Grapholita discretana Wocke, 1861
Grapholita fissana (Frolich, 1828)
Grapholita gemmiferana Treitschke, 1835
Grapholita internana (Guenee, 1845)
Grapholita jungiella (Clerck, 1759)
Grapholita lathyrana (Hübner, 1822)
Grapholita lunulana (Denis & Schiffermüller, 1775)
Grapholita nebritana Treitschke, 1830
Grapholita pallifrontana Lienig & Zeller, 1846
Gynnidomorpha alismana (Ragonot, 1883)
Gynnidomorpha permixtana (Denis & Schiffermüller, 1775)
Gypsonoma aceriana (Duponchel, 1843)
Gypsonoma minutana (Hübner, 1799)
Gypsonoma nitidulana (Lienig & Zeller, 1846)
Gypsonoma sociana (Haworth, 1811)
Hedya dimidiana (Clerck, 1759)
Hedya nubiferana (Haworth, 1811)
Hedya ochroleucana (Frolich, 1828)
Hedya pruniana (Hübner, 1799)
Hedya salicella (Linnaeus, 1758)
Hysterophora maculosana (Haworth, 1811)
Isotrias hybridana (Hübner, 1817)
Isotrias rectifasciana (Haworth, 1811)
Lathronympha strigana (Fabricius, 1775)
Lepteucosma huebneriana Kocak, 1980
Lobesia andereggiana (Herrich-Schäffer, 1851)
Lobesia botrana (Denis & Schiffermüller, 1775)
Lobesia reliquana (Hübner, 1825)
Lobesia occidentis Falkovitsh, 1970
Lozotaenia forsterana (Fabricius, 1781)
Lozotaeniodes cupressana (Duponchel, 1836)
Metendothenia atropunctana (Zetterstedt, 1839)
Neosphaleroptera nubilana (Hübner, 1799)
Notocelia cynosbatella (Linnaeus, 1758)
Notocelia roborana (Denis & Schiffermüller, 1775)
Notocelia tetragonana (Stephens, 1834)
Notocelia trimaculana (Haworth, 1811)
Notocelia uddmanniana (Linnaeus, 1758)
Olethreutes arcuella (Clerck, 1759)
Olindia schumacherana (Fabricius, 1787)
Orthotaenia undulana (Denis & Schiffermüller, 1775)
Pammene argyrana (Hübner, 1799)
Pammene aurana (Fabricius, 1775)
Pammene aurita Razowski, 1991
Pammene fasciana (Linnaeus, 1761)
Pammene germmana (Hübner, 1799)
Pammene insulana (Guenee, 1845)
Pammene ochsenheimeriana (Lienig & Zeller, 1846)
Pammene populana (Fabricius, 1787)
Pammene regiana (Zeller, 1849)
Pammene rhediella (Clerck, 1759)
Pammene spiniana (Duponchel, 1843)
Pammene splendidulana (Guenee, 1845)
Pammene trauniana (Denis & Schiffermüller, 1775)
Pandemis cerasana (Hübner, 1786)
Pandemis cinnamomeana (Treitschke, 1830)
Pandemis corylana (Fabricius, 1794)
Pandemis dumetana (Treitschke, 1835)
Pandemis heparana (Denis & Schiffermüller, 1775)
Paramesia gnomana (Clerck, 1759)
Pelatea klugiana (Freyer, 1836)
Pelochrista caecimaculana (Hübner, 1799)
Pelochrista hepatariana (Herrich-Schäffer, 1851)
Pelochrista modicana (Zeller, 1847)
Pelochrista mollitana (Zeller, 1847)
Periclepsis cinctana (Denis & Schiffermüller, 1775)
Phalonidia curvistrigana (Stainton, 1859)
Phalonidia gilvicomana (Zeller, 1847)
Phalonidia manniana (Fischer v. Röslerstamm, 1839)
Phiaris bipunctana (Fabricius, 1794)
Phiaris helveticana Duponchel, 1844
Phiaris micana (Denis & Schiffermüller, 1775)
Phiaris palustrana (Lienig & Zeller, 1846)
Phiaris schulziana (Fabricius, 1776)
Phiaris scoriana (Guenee, 1845)
Phiaris stibiana (Guenee, 1845)
Phiaris umbrosana (Freyer, 1842)
Philedone gerningana (Denis & Schiffermüller, 1775)
Philedonides lunana (Thunberg, 1784)
Phtheochroa inopiana (Haworth, 1811)
Phtheochroa rugosana (Hübner, 1799)
Phtheochroa schreibersiana (Frolich, 1828)
Phtheochroa sodaliana (Haworth, 1811)
Piniphila bifasciana (Haworth, 1811)
Pristerognatha penthinana (Guenee, 1845)
Prochlidonia amiantana (Hübner, 1799)
Pseudargyrotoza conwagana (Fabricius, 1775)
Pseudeulia asinana (Hübner, 1799)
Pseudococcyx mughiana (Zeller, 1868)
Pseudococcyx posticana (Zetterstedt, 1839)
Pseudococcyx turionella (Linnaeus, 1758)
Pseudohermenias abietana (Fabricius, 1787)
Pseudosciaphila branderiana (Linnaeus, 1758)
Ptycholoma lecheana (Linnaeus, 1758)
Ptycholomoides aeriferana (Herrich-Schäffer, 1851)
Retinia resinella (Linnaeus, 1758)
Rhopobota myrtillana (Humphreys & Westwood, 1845)
Rhopobota naevana (Hübner, 1817)
Rhopobota stagnana (Denis & Schiffermüller, 1775)
Rhopobota ustomaculana (Curtis, 1831)
Rhyacionia buoliana (Denis & Schiffermüller, 1775)
Rhyacionia duplana (Hübner, 1813)
Rhyacionia hafneri (Rebel, 1937)
Rhyacionia pinicolana (Doubleday, 1849)
Rhyacionia pinivorana (Lienig & Zeller, 1846)
Sparganothis pilleriana (Denis & Schiffermüller, 1775)
Spatalistis bifasciana (Hübner, 1787)
Sphaleroptera alpicolana (Frolich, 1830)
Spilonota laricana (Heinemann, 1863)
Spilonota ocellana (Denis & Schiffermüller, 1775)
Stictea mygindiana (Denis & Schiffermüller, 1775)
Strophedra nitidana (Fabricius, 1794)
Syndemis musculana (Hübner, 1799)
Thiodia torridana (Lederer, 1859)
Thiodia trochilana (Frolich, 1828)
Tortricodes alternella (Denis & Schiffermüller, 1775)
Tortrix viridana Linnaeus, 1758
Tosirips magyarus Razowski, 1987
Xerocnephasia rigana (Sodoffsky, 1829)
Zeiraphera griseana (Hübner, 1799)
Zeiraphera isertana (Fabricius, 1794)
Zeiraphera ratzeburgiana (Saxesen, 1840)
Zeiraphera rufimitrana (Herrich-Schäffer, 1851)

Yponomeutidae
Kessleria burmanni Huemer & Tarmann, 1992
Kessleria nivescens Burmann, 1980
Kessleria petrobiella (Zeller, 1868)

Zygaenidae
Adscita albanica (Naufock, 1926)
Adscita geryon (Hübner, 1813)
Adscita statices (Linnaeus, 1758)
Adscita mannii (Lederer, 1853)
Jordanita globulariae (Hübner, 1793)
Jordanita subsolana (Staudinger, 1862)
Jordanita budensis (Ad. & Au. Speyer, 1858)
Jordanita notata (Zeller, 1847)
Rhagades pruni (Denis & Schiffermüller, 1775)
Theresimima ampellophaga (Bayle-Barelle, 1808)
Zygaena carniolica (Scopoli, 1763)
Zygaena cynarae (Esper, 1789)
Zygaena minos (Denis & Schiffermüller, 1775)
Zygaena punctum Ochsenheimer, 1808
Zygaena purpuralis (Brunnich, 1763)
Zygaena angelicae Ochsenheimer, 1808
Zygaena ephialtes (Linnaeus, 1767)
Zygaena filipendulae (Linnaeus, 1758)
Zygaena lonicerae (Scheven, 1777)
Zygaena loti (Denis & Schiffermüller, 1775)
Zygaena osterodensis Reiss, 1921
Zygaena transalpina (Esper, 1780)
Zygaena viciae (Denis & Schiffermüller, 1775)

References

External links
Fauna Europaea

Slovenia
Slovenia
 Slovenia
Lepidoptera